

113001–113100 

|-bgcolor=#E9E9E9
| 113001 ||  || — || September 5, 2002 || Socorro || LINEAR || — || align=right | 2.9 km || 
|-id=002 bgcolor=#E9E9E9
| 113002 ||  || — || September 5, 2002 || Anderson Mesa || LONEOS || — || align=right | 4.9 km || 
|-id=003 bgcolor=#fefefe
| 113003 ||  || — || September 5, 2002 || Anderson Mesa || LONEOS || SUL || align=right | 4.1 km || 
|-id=004 bgcolor=#fefefe
| 113004 ||  || — || September 5, 2002 || Anderson Mesa || LONEOS || NYS || align=right data-sort-value="0.97" | 970 m || 
|-id=005 bgcolor=#E9E9E9
| 113005 ||  || — || September 5, 2002 || Anderson Mesa || LONEOS || — || align=right | 3.8 km || 
|-id=006 bgcolor=#E9E9E9
| 113006 ||  || — || September 5, 2002 || Anderson Mesa || LONEOS || — || align=right | 2.8 km || 
|-id=007 bgcolor=#d6d6d6
| 113007 ||  || — || September 5, 2002 || Socorro || LINEAR || EOS || align=right | 4.2 km || 
|-id=008 bgcolor=#E9E9E9
| 113008 ||  || — || September 5, 2002 || Socorro || LINEAR || — || align=right | 3.8 km || 
|-id=009 bgcolor=#fefefe
| 113009 ||  || — || September 5, 2002 || Socorro || LINEAR || — || align=right | 1.5 km || 
|-id=010 bgcolor=#fefefe
| 113010 ||  || — || September 5, 2002 || Socorro || LINEAR || — || align=right | 1.3 km || 
|-id=011 bgcolor=#d6d6d6
| 113011 ||  || — || September 5, 2002 || Socorro || LINEAR || — || align=right | 5.0 km || 
|-id=012 bgcolor=#d6d6d6
| 113012 ||  || — || September 5, 2002 || Socorro || LINEAR || — || align=right | 7.6 km || 
|-id=013 bgcolor=#d6d6d6
| 113013 ||  || — || September 5, 2002 || Socorro || LINEAR || THM || align=right | 5.9 km || 
|-id=014 bgcolor=#E9E9E9
| 113014 ||  || — || September 5, 2002 || Socorro || LINEAR || — || align=right | 4.3 km || 
|-id=015 bgcolor=#E9E9E9
| 113015 ||  || — || September 5, 2002 || Socorro || LINEAR || — || align=right | 3.7 km || 
|-id=016 bgcolor=#E9E9E9
| 113016 ||  || — || September 5, 2002 || Socorro || LINEAR || — || align=right | 2.8 km || 
|-id=017 bgcolor=#fefefe
| 113017 ||  || — || September 5, 2002 || Socorro || LINEAR || — || align=right | 1.4 km || 
|-id=018 bgcolor=#d6d6d6
| 113018 ||  || — || September 5, 2002 || Socorro || LINEAR || — || align=right | 4.9 km || 
|-id=019 bgcolor=#fefefe
| 113019 ||  || — || September 5, 2002 || Socorro || LINEAR || NYS || align=right | 1.4 km || 
|-id=020 bgcolor=#fefefe
| 113020 ||  || — || September 5, 2002 || Socorro || LINEAR || NYS || align=right | 1.3 km || 
|-id=021 bgcolor=#d6d6d6
| 113021 ||  || — || September 5, 2002 || Socorro || LINEAR || K-2 || align=right | 3.5 km || 
|-id=022 bgcolor=#E9E9E9
| 113022 ||  || — || September 5, 2002 || Socorro || LINEAR || — || align=right | 2.1 km || 
|-id=023 bgcolor=#E9E9E9
| 113023 ||  || — || September 5, 2002 || Socorro || LINEAR || — || align=right | 1.5 km || 
|-id=024 bgcolor=#d6d6d6
| 113024 ||  || — || September 5, 2002 || Socorro || LINEAR || — || align=right | 6.8 km || 
|-id=025 bgcolor=#d6d6d6
| 113025 ||  || — || September 5, 2002 || Socorro || LINEAR || CHA || align=right | 4.2 km || 
|-id=026 bgcolor=#d6d6d6
| 113026 ||  || — || September 5, 2002 || Socorro || LINEAR || KOR || align=right | 2.9 km || 
|-id=027 bgcolor=#fefefe
| 113027 ||  || — || September 5, 2002 || Socorro || LINEAR || NYS || align=right | 1.2 km || 
|-id=028 bgcolor=#fefefe
| 113028 ||  || — || September 5, 2002 || Socorro || LINEAR || — || align=right | 2.0 km || 
|-id=029 bgcolor=#fefefe
| 113029 ||  || — || September 5, 2002 || Socorro || LINEAR || — || align=right | 1.4 km || 
|-id=030 bgcolor=#E9E9E9
| 113030 ||  || — || September 5, 2002 || Socorro || LINEAR || — || align=right | 1.6 km || 
|-id=031 bgcolor=#fefefe
| 113031 ||  || — || September 5, 2002 || Socorro || LINEAR || — || align=right | 1.5 km || 
|-id=032 bgcolor=#fefefe
| 113032 ||  || — || September 5, 2002 || Socorro || LINEAR || FLO || align=right | 1.5 km || 
|-id=033 bgcolor=#E9E9E9
| 113033 ||  || — || September 5, 2002 || Socorro || LINEAR || — || align=right | 2.0 km || 
|-id=034 bgcolor=#fefefe
| 113034 ||  || — || September 5, 2002 || Socorro || LINEAR || NYS || align=right | 1.2 km || 
|-id=035 bgcolor=#d6d6d6
| 113035 ||  || — || September 5, 2002 || Socorro || LINEAR || — || align=right | 6.6 km || 
|-id=036 bgcolor=#fefefe
| 113036 ||  || — || September 5, 2002 || Socorro || LINEAR || — || align=right | 1.6 km || 
|-id=037 bgcolor=#d6d6d6
| 113037 ||  || — || September 5, 2002 || Socorro || LINEAR || — || align=right | 5.8 km || 
|-id=038 bgcolor=#fefefe
| 113038 ||  || — || September 5, 2002 || Socorro || LINEAR || — || align=right | 1.4 km || 
|-id=039 bgcolor=#fefefe
| 113039 ||  || — || September 5, 2002 || Socorro || LINEAR || — || align=right | 1.6 km || 
|-id=040 bgcolor=#E9E9E9
| 113040 ||  || — || September 5, 2002 || Socorro || LINEAR || — || align=right | 2.0 km || 
|-id=041 bgcolor=#E9E9E9
| 113041 ||  || — || September 5, 2002 || Socorro || LINEAR || WIT || align=right | 1.9 km || 
|-id=042 bgcolor=#fefefe
| 113042 ||  || — || September 5, 2002 || Socorro || LINEAR || NYS || align=right | 1.7 km || 
|-id=043 bgcolor=#fefefe
| 113043 ||  || — || September 5, 2002 || Socorro || LINEAR || MAS || align=right | 1.6 km || 
|-id=044 bgcolor=#d6d6d6
| 113044 ||  || — || September 5, 2002 || Socorro || LINEAR || THM || align=right | 4.5 km || 
|-id=045 bgcolor=#fefefe
| 113045 ||  || — || September 5, 2002 || Socorro || LINEAR || NYS || align=right | 1.4 km || 
|-id=046 bgcolor=#E9E9E9
| 113046 ||  || — || September 5, 2002 || Socorro || LINEAR || — || align=right | 2.7 km || 
|-id=047 bgcolor=#d6d6d6
| 113047 ||  || — || September 5, 2002 || Socorro || LINEAR || — || align=right | 8.6 km || 
|-id=048 bgcolor=#E9E9E9
| 113048 ||  || — || September 5, 2002 || Socorro || LINEAR || — || align=right | 3.3 km || 
|-id=049 bgcolor=#d6d6d6
| 113049 ||  || — || September 5, 2002 || Socorro || LINEAR || KOR || align=right | 3.3 km || 
|-id=050 bgcolor=#fefefe
| 113050 ||  || — || September 5, 2002 || Socorro || LINEAR || NYS || align=right | 1.1 km || 
|-id=051 bgcolor=#E9E9E9
| 113051 ||  || — || September 5, 2002 || Socorro || LINEAR || MRX || align=right | 2.0 km || 
|-id=052 bgcolor=#E9E9E9
| 113052 ||  || — || September 5, 2002 || Socorro || LINEAR || — || align=right | 3.9 km || 
|-id=053 bgcolor=#fefefe
| 113053 ||  || — || September 5, 2002 || Socorro || LINEAR || — || align=right | 1.2 km || 
|-id=054 bgcolor=#d6d6d6
| 113054 ||  || — || September 5, 2002 || Socorro || LINEAR || — || align=right | 7.0 km || 
|-id=055 bgcolor=#E9E9E9
| 113055 ||  || — || September 5, 2002 || Socorro || LINEAR || — || align=right | 2.2 km || 
|-id=056 bgcolor=#E9E9E9
| 113056 ||  || — || September 5, 2002 || Anderson Mesa || LONEOS || — || align=right | 2.8 km || 
|-id=057 bgcolor=#fefefe
| 113057 ||  || — || September 5, 2002 || Anderson Mesa || LONEOS || — || align=right | 1.4 km || 
|-id=058 bgcolor=#E9E9E9
| 113058 ||  || — || September 5, 2002 || Anderson Mesa || LONEOS || ADE || align=right | 5.1 km || 
|-id=059 bgcolor=#d6d6d6
| 113059 ||  || — || September 5, 2002 || Anderson Mesa || LONEOS || HYG || align=right | 5.6 km || 
|-id=060 bgcolor=#d6d6d6
| 113060 ||  || — || September 5, 2002 || Anderson Mesa || LONEOS || HYG || align=right | 5.8 km || 
|-id=061 bgcolor=#d6d6d6
| 113061 ||  || — || September 5, 2002 || Anderson Mesa || LONEOS || EOS || align=right | 3.7 km || 
|-id=062 bgcolor=#d6d6d6
| 113062 ||  || — || September 5, 2002 || Anderson Mesa || LONEOS || EOS || align=right | 3.6 km || 
|-id=063 bgcolor=#E9E9E9
| 113063 ||  || — || September 5, 2002 || Anderson Mesa || LONEOS || — || align=right | 4.2 km || 
|-id=064 bgcolor=#E9E9E9
| 113064 ||  || — || September 5, 2002 || Socorro || LINEAR || KON || align=right | 3.8 km || 
|-id=065 bgcolor=#E9E9E9
| 113065 ||  || — || September 5, 2002 || Anderson Mesa || LONEOS || WIT || align=right | 2.4 km || 
|-id=066 bgcolor=#fefefe
| 113066 ||  || — || September 5, 2002 || Socorro || LINEAR || NYS || align=right | 1.3 km || 
|-id=067 bgcolor=#d6d6d6
| 113067 ||  || — || September 5, 2002 || Socorro || LINEAR || KOR || align=right | 3.7 km || 
|-id=068 bgcolor=#fefefe
| 113068 ||  || — || September 5, 2002 || Anderson Mesa || LONEOS || — || align=right | 1.2 km || 
|-id=069 bgcolor=#E9E9E9
| 113069 ||  || — || September 5, 2002 || Socorro || LINEAR || — || align=right | 5.1 km || 
|-id=070 bgcolor=#E9E9E9
| 113070 ||  || — || September 5, 2002 || Socorro || LINEAR || — || align=right | 6.6 km || 
|-id=071 bgcolor=#FA8072
| 113071 ||  || — || September 5, 2002 || Socorro || LINEAR || — || align=right | 1.4 km || 
|-id=072 bgcolor=#E9E9E9
| 113072 ||  || — || September 5, 2002 || Socorro || LINEAR || — || align=right | 1.9 km || 
|-id=073 bgcolor=#E9E9E9
| 113073 ||  || — || September 5, 2002 || Socorro || LINEAR || — || align=right | 3.6 km || 
|-id=074 bgcolor=#fefefe
| 113074 ||  || — || September 5, 2002 || Socorro || LINEAR || — || align=right | 1.8 km || 
|-id=075 bgcolor=#d6d6d6
| 113075 ||  || — || September 5, 2002 || Socorro || LINEAR || — || align=right | 6.0 km || 
|-id=076 bgcolor=#fefefe
| 113076 ||  || — || September 5, 2002 || Socorro || LINEAR || FLO || align=right | 1.3 km || 
|-id=077 bgcolor=#d6d6d6
| 113077 ||  || — || September 5, 2002 || Socorro || LINEAR || EOS || align=right | 3.8 km || 
|-id=078 bgcolor=#E9E9E9
| 113078 ||  || — || September 5, 2002 || Socorro || LINEAR || RAF || align=right | 1.7 km || 
|-id=079 bgcolor=#E9E9E9
| 113079 ||  || — || September 5, 2002 || Socorro || LINEAR || — || align=right | 1.8 km || 
|-id=080 bgcolor=#E9E9E9
| 113080 ||  || — || September 5, 2002 || Socorro || LINEAR || INO || align=right | 2.3 km || 
|-id=081 bgcolor=#E9E9E9
| 113081 ||  || — || September 5, 2002 || Socorro || LINEAR || ADE || align=right | 5.6 km || 
|-id=082 bgcolor=#fefefe
| 113082 ||  || — || September 5, 2002 || Socorro || LINEAR || — || align=right | 4.1 km || 
|-id=083 bgcolor=#E9E9E9
| 113083 ||  || — || September 5, 2002 || Socorro || LINEAR || — || align=right | 7.3 km || 
|-id=084 bgcolor=#E9E9E9
| 113084 ||  || — || September 5, 2002 || Socorro || LINEAR || — || align=right | 3.7 km || 
|-id=085 bgcolor=#d6d6d6
| 113085 ||  || — || September 5, 2002 || Socorro || LINEAR || EOS || align=right | 4.5 km || 
|-id=086 bgcolor=#d6d6d6
| 113086 ||  || — || September 3, 2002 || Palomar || NEAT || — || align=right | 5.3 km || 
|-id=087 bgcolor=#E9E9E9
| 113087 ||  || — || September 4, 2002 || Anderson Mesa || LONEOS || — || align=right | 3.3 km || 
|-id=088 bgcolor=#d6d6d6
| 113088 ||  || — || September 4, 2002 || Anderson Mesa || LONEOS || — || align=right | 4.4 km || 
|-id=089 bgcolor=#E9E9E9
| 113089 ||  || — || September 4, 2002 || Palomar || NEAT || KON || align=right | 3.6 km || 
|-id=090 bgcolor=#d6d6d6
| 113090 ||  || — || September 4, 2002 || Palomar || NEAT || — || align=right | 4.6 km || 
|-id=091 bgcolor=#E9E9E9
| 113091 ||  || — || September 5, 2002 || Anderson Mesa || LONEOS || HEN || align=right | 1.8 km || 
|-id=092 bgcolor=#d6d6d6
| 113092 ||  || — || September 5, 2002 || Socorro || LINEAR || — || align=right | 9.1 km || 
|-id=093 bgcolor=#fefefe
| 113093 ||  || — || September 5, 2002 || Socorro || LINEAR || — || align=right | 1.6 km || 
|-id=094 bgcolor=#E9E9E9
| 113094 ||  || — || September 5, 2002 || Socorro || LINEAR || — || align=right | 3.8 km || 
|-id=095 bgcolor=#E9E9E9
| 113095 ||  || — || September 5, 2002 || Socorro || LINEAR || — || align=right | 2.7 km || 
|-id=096 bgcolor=#d6d6d6
| 113096 ||  || — || September 5, 2002 || Socorro || LINEAR || EOS || align=right | 3.7 km || 
|-id=097 bgcolor=#fefefe
| 113097 ||  || — || September 5, 2002 || Socorro || LINEAR || — || align=right | 1.1 km || 
|-id=098 bgcolor=#d6d6d6
| 113098 ||  || — || September 5, 2002 || Socorro || LINEAR || — || align=right | 4.0 km || 
|-id=099 bgcolor=#d6d6d6
| 113099 ||  || — || September 5, 2002 || Socorro || LINEAR || KOR || align=right | 3.3 km || 
|-id=100 bgcolor=#E9E9E9
| 113100 ||  || — || September 5, 2002 || Socorro || LINEAR || — || align=right | 3.2 km || 
|}

113101–113200 

|-bgcolor=#d6d6d6
| 113101 ||  || — || September 5, 2002 || Socorro || LINEAR || — || align=right | 5.6 km || 
|-id=102 bgcolor=#E9E9E9
| 113102 ||  || — || September 5, 2002 || Socorro || LINEAR || — || align=right | 2.6 km || 
|-id=103 bgcolor=#fefefe
| 113103 ||  || — || September 5, 2002 || Socorro || LINEAR || MAS || align=right | 1.3 km || 
|-id=104 bgcolor=#E9E9E9
| 113104 ||  || — || September 5, 2002 || Socorro || LINEAR || ADE || align=right | 3.9 km || 
|-id=105 bgcolor=#fefefe
| 113105 ||  || — || September 5, 2002 || Socorro || LINEAR || NYS || align=right | 1.0 km || 
|-id=106 bgcolor=#E9E9E9
| 113106 ||  || — || September 5, 2002 || Socorro || LINEAR || — || align=right | 3.3 km || 
|-id=107 bgcolor=#E9E9E9
| 113107 ||  || — || September 5, 2002 || Socorro || LINEAR || — || align=right | 3.7 km || 
|-id=108 bgcolor=#d6d6d6
| 113108 ||  || — || September 5, 2002 || Socorro || LINEAR || 628 || align=right | 3.7 km || 
|-id=109 bgcolor=#d6d6d6
| 113109 ||  || — || September 5, 2002 || Socorro || LINEAR || — || align=right | 4.9 km || 
|-id=110 bgcolor=#fefefe
| 113110 ||  || — || September 5, 2002 || Socorro || LINEAR || NYS || align=right | 1.3 km || 
|-id=111 bgcolor=#E9E9E9
| 113111 ||  || — || September 5, 2002 || Socorro || LINEAR || — || align=right | 3.4 km || 
|-id=112 bgcolor=#d6d6d6
| 113112 ||  || — || September 5, 2002 || Socorro || LINEAR || EOS || align=right | 5.1 km || 
|-id=113 bgcolor=#d6d6d6
| 113113 ||  || — || September 5, 2002 || Socorro || LINEAR || — || align=right | 4.5 km || 
|-id=114 bgcolor=#E9E9E9
| 113114 ||  || — || September 5, 2002 || Socorro || LINEAR || WIT || align=right | 1.9 km || 
|-id=115 bgcolor=#fefefe
| 113115 ||  || — || September 5, 2002 || Socorro || LINEAR || — || align=right | 1.5 km || 
|-id=116 bgcolor=#fefefe
| 113116 ||  || — || September 5, 2002 || Socorro || LINEAR || NYS || align=right | 1.7 km || 
|-id=117 bgcolor=#d6d6d6
| 113117 ||  || — || September 5, 2002 || Socorro || LINEAR || THM || align=right | 5.7 km || 
|-id=118 bgcolor=#E9E9E9
| 113118 ||  || — || September 5, 2002 || Socorro || LINEAR || — || align=right | 2.1 km || 
|-id=119 bgcolor=#fefefe
| 113119 ||  || — || September 5, 2002 || Socorro || LINEAR || — || align=right | 1.2 km || 
|-id=120 bgcolor=#d6d6d6
| 113120 ||  || — || September 5, 2002 || Socorro || LINEAR || — || align=right | 4.9 km || 
|-id=121 bgcolor=#E9E9E9
| 113121 ||  || — || September 5, 2002 || Socorro || LINEAR || — || align=right | 3.4 km || 
|-id=122 bgcolor=#E9E9E9
| 113122 ||  || — || September 5, 2002 || Socorro || LINEAR || — || align=right | 4.7 km || 
|-id=123 bgcolor=#E9E9E9
| 113123 ||  || — || September 5, 2002 || Socorro || LINEAR || — || align=right | 1.5 km || 
|-id=124 bgcolor=#fefefe
| 113124 ||  || — || September 5, 2002 || Socorro || LINEAR || — || align=right | 1.4 km || 
|-id=125 bgcolor=#E9E9E9
| 113125 ||  || — || September 5, 2002 || Socorro || LINEAR || INO || align=right | 2.2 km || 
|-id=126 bgcolor=#d6d6d6
| 113126 ||  || — || September 5, 2002 || Socorro || LINEAR || THM || align=right | 5.9 km || 
|-id=127 bgcolor=#E9E9E9
| 113127 ||  || — || September 5, 2002 || Socorro || LINEAR || — || align=right | 3.6 km || 
|-id=128 bgcolor=#d6d6d6
| 113128 ||  || — || September 5, 2002 || Socorro || LINEAR || — || align=right | 5.1 km || 
|-id=129 bgcolor=#E9E9E9
| 113129 ||  || — || September 5, 2002 || Socorro || LINEAR || NEM || align=right | 4.1 km || 
|-id=130 bgcolor=#E9E9E9
| 113130 ||  || — || September 5, 2002 || Socorro || LINEAR || — || align=right | 5.6 km || 
|-id=131 bgcolor=#d6d6d6
| 113131 ||  || — || September 5, 2002 || Socorro || LINEAR || — || align=right | 6.8 km || 
|-id=132 bgcolor=#fefefe
| 113132 ||  || — || September 5, 2002 || Socorro || LINEAR || — || align=right | 1.6 km || 
|-id=133 bgcolor=#d6d6d6
| 113133 ||  || — || September 5, 2002 || Socorro || LINEAR || VER || align=right | 6.0 km || 
|-id=134 bgcolor=#E9E9E9
| 113134 ||  || — || September 5, 2002 || Socorro || LINEAR || — || align=right | 3.5 km || 
|-id=135 bgcolor=#d6d6d6
| 113135 ||  || — || September 5, 2002 || Socorro || LINEAR || — || align=right | 4.6 km || 
|-id=136 bgcolor=#fefefe
| 113136 ||  || — || September 5, 2002 || Socorro || LINEAR || NYS || align=right | 1.1 km || 
|-id=137 bgcolor=#fefefe
| 113137 ||  || — || September 5, 2002 || Socorro || LINEAR || NYS || align=right | 1.3 km || 
|-id=138 bgcolor=#fefefe
| 113138 ||  || — || September 5, 2002 || Socorro || LINEAR || — || align=right | 1.8 km || 
|-id=139 bgcolor=#fefefe
| 113139 ||  || — || September 5, 2002 || Socorro || LINEAR || — || align=right | 1.6 km || 
|-id=140 bgcolor=#fefefe
| 113140 ||  || — || September 5, 2002 || Socorro || LINEAR || — || align=right | 1.3 km || 
|-id=141 bgcolor=#d6d6d6
| 113141 ||  || — || September 5, 2002 || Socorro || LINEAR || — || align=right | 4.8 km || 
|-id=142 bgcolor=#E9E9E9
| 113142 ||  || — || September 5, 2002 || Socorro || LINEAR || — || align=right | 4.6 km || 
|-id=143 bgcolor=#d6d6d6
| 113143 ||  || — || September 5, 2002 || Socorro || LINEAR || THM || align=right | 5.4 km || 
|-id=144 bgcolor=#d6d6d6
| 113144 ||  || — || September 5, 2002 || Socorro || LINEAR || — || align=right | 8.7 km || 
|-id=145 bgcolor=#d6d6d6
| 113145 ||  || — || September 5, 2002 || Anderson Mesa || LONEOS || — || align=right | 6.4 km || 
|-id=146 bgcolor=#d6d6d6
| 113146 ||  || — || September 5, 2002 || Anderson Mesa || LONEOS || CHA || align=right | 3.7 km || 
|-id=147 bgcolor=#d6d6d6
| 113147 ||  || — || September 5, 2002 || Socorro || LINEAR || — || align=right | 4.3 km || 
|-id=148 bgcolor=#E9E9E9
| 113148 ||  || — || September 5, 2002 || Socorro || LINEAR || — || align=right | 1.8 km || 
|-id=149 bgcolor=#E9E9E9
| 113149 ||  || — || September 5, 2002 || Socorro || LINEAR || KON || align=right | 4.7 km || 
|-id=150 bgcolor=#E9E9E9
| 113150 ||  || — || September 5, 2002 || Socorro || LINEAR || — || align=right | 3.3 km || 
|-id=151 bgcolor=#d6d6d6
| 113151 ||  || — || September 5, 2002 || Socorro || LINEAR || — || align=right | 5.1 km || 
|-id=152 bgcolor=#fefefe
| 113152 ||  || — || September 5, 2002 || Socorro || LINEAR || — || align=right | 1.6 km || 
|-id=153 bgcolor=#fefefe
| 113153 ||  || — || September 5, 2002 || Socorro || LINEAR || NYS || align=right | 1.2 km || 
|-id=154 bgcolor=#d6d6d6
| 113154 ||  || — || September 5, 2002 || Socorro || LINEAR || KOR || align=right | 2.7 km || 
|-id=155 bgcolor=#E9E9E9
| 113155 ||  || — || September 5, 2002 || Socorro || LINEAR || — || align=right | 2.0 km || 
|-id=156 bgcolor=#d6d6d6
| 113156 ||  || — || September 5, 2002 || Socorro || LINEAR || — || align=right | 3.4 km || 
|-id=157 bgcolor=#d6d6d6
| 113157 ||  || — || September 5, 2002 || Socorro || LINEAR || — || align=right | 3.7 km || 
|-id=158 bgcolor=#fefefe
| 113158 ||  || — || September 5, 2002 || Socorro || LINEAR || NYS || align=right | 1.2 km || 
|-id=159 bgcolor=#fefefe
| 113159 ||  || — || September 5, 2002 || Socorro || LINEAR || FLO || align=right | 1.2 km || 
|-id=160 bgcolor=#d6d6d6
| 113160 ||  || — || September 5, 2002 || Socorro || LINEAR || — || align=right | 4.6 km || 
|-id=161 bgcolor=#fefefe
| 113161 ||  || — || September 5, 2002 || Socorro || LINEAR || — || align=right | 1.7 km || 
|-id=162 bgcolor=#E9E9E9
| 113162 ||  || — || September 5, 2002 || Socorro || LINEAR || — || align=right | 4.1 km || 
|-id=163 bgcolor=#E9E9E9
| 113163 ||  || — || September 5, 2002 || Socorro || LINEAR || — || align=right | 4.9 km || 
|-id=164 bgcolor=#E9E9E9
| 113164 ||  || — || September 5, 2002 || Socorro || LINEAR || — || align=right | 1.8 km || 
|-id=165 bgcolor=#E9E9E9
| 113165 ||  || — || September 5, 2002 || Socorro || LINEAR || — || align=right | 4.0 km || 
|-id=166 bgcolor=#E9E9E9
| 113166 ||  || — || September 5, 2002 || Socorro || LINEAR || — || align=right | 1.7 km || 
|-id=167 bgcolor=#E9E9E9
| 113167 ||  || — || September 5, 2002 || Socorro || LINEAR || — || align=right | 4.2 km || 
|-id=168 bgcolor=#d6d6d6
| 113168 ||  || — || September 5, 2002 || Socorro || LINEAR || — || align=right | 7.8 km || 
|-id=169 bgcolor=#fefefe
| 113169 ||  || — || September 5, 2002 || Socorro || LINEAR || — || align=right | 1.6 km || 
|-id=170 bgcolor=#d6d6d6
| 113170 ||  || — || September 5, 2002 || Socorro || LINEAR || — || align=right | 4.3 km || 
|-id=171 bgcolor=#E9E9E9
| 113171 ||  || — || September 5, 2002 || Socorro || LINEAR || — || align=right | 6.5 km || 
|-id=172 bgcolor=#d6d6d6
| 113172 ||  || — || September 5, 2002 || Socorro || LINEAR || — || align=right | 5.2 km || 
|-id=173 bgcolor=#d6d6d6
| 113173 ||  || — || September 5, 2002 || Socorro || LINEAR || — || align=right | 5.9 km || 
|-id=174 bgcolor=#d6d6d6
| 113174 ||  || — || September 5, 2002 || Socorro || LINEAR || — || align=right | 5.5 km || 
|-id=175 bgcolor=#E9E9E9
| 113175 ||  || — || September 5, 2002 || Socorro || LINEAR || — || align=right | 3.1 km || 
|-id=176 bgcolor=#E9E9E9
| 113176 ||  || — || September 5, 2002 || Socorro || LINEAR || EUN || align=right | 3.5 km || 
|-id=177 bgcolor=#E9E9E9
| 113177 ||  || — || September 5, 2002 || Socorro || LINEAR || GEF || align=right | 1.9 km || 
|-id=178 bgcolor=#d6d6d6
| 113178 ||  || — || September 5, 2002 || Socorro || LINEAR || HYG || align=right | 4.8 km || 
|-id=179 bgcolor=#fefefe
| 113179 ||  || — || September 5, 2002 || Socorro || LINEAR || — || align=right | 2.2 km || 
|-id=180 bgcolor=#E9E9E9
| 113180 ||  || — || September 5, 2002 || Socorro || LINEAR || — || align=right | 2.3 km || 
|-id=181 bgcolor=#E9E9E9
| 113181 ||  || — || September 5, 2002 || Socorro || LINEAR || — || align=right | 3.2 km || 
|-id=182 bgcolor=#d6d6d6
| 113182 ||  || — || September 5, 2002 || Socorro || LINEAR || — || align=right | 5.6 km || 
|-id=183 bgcolor=#fefefe
| 113183 ||  || — || September 5, 2002 || Socorro || LINEAR || V || align=right | 1.4 km || 
|-id=184 bgcolor=#fefefe
| 113184 ||  || — || September 5, 2002 || Socorro || LINEAR || — || align=right | 1.6 km || 
|-id=185 bgcolor=#E9E9E9
| 113185 ||  || — || September 5, 2002 || Socorro || LINEAR || INO || align=right | 3.0 km || 
|-id=186 bgcolor=#fefefe
| 113186 ||  || — || September 5, 2002 || Socorro || LINEAR || FLO || align=right | 1.5 km || 
|-id=187 bgcolor=#d6d6d6
| 113187 ||  || — || September 5, 2002 || Socorro || LINEAR || EOS || align=right | 6.5 km || 
|-id=188 bgcolor=#E9E9E9
| 113188 ||  || — || September 5, 2002 || Socorro || LINEAR || EUN || align=right | 2.2 km || 
|-id=189 bgcolor=#d6d6d6
| 113189 ||  || — || September 5, 2002 || Socorro || LINEAR || — || align=right | 5.2 km || 
|-id=190 bgcolor=#E9E9E9
| 113190 ||  || — || September 5, 2002 || Socorro || LINEAR || — || align=right | 2.2 km || 
|-id=191 bgcolor=#d6d6d6
| 113191 ||  || — || September 5, 2002 || Socorro || LINEAR || — || align=right | 8.0 km || 
|-id=192 bgcolor=#E9E9E9
| 113192 ||  || — || September 5, 2002 || Socorro || LINEAR || — || align=right | 2.1 km || 
|-id=193 bgcolor=#E9E9E9
| 113193 ||  || — || September 5, 2002 || Socorro || LINEAR || GEF || align=right | 2.9 km || 
|-id=194 bgcolor=#E9E9E9
| 113194 ||  || — || September 5, 2002 || Socorro || LINEAR || — || align=right | 5.2 km || 
|-id=195 bgcolor=#d6d6d6
| 113195 ||  || — || September 5, 2002 || Socorro || LINEAR || — || align=right | 7.4 km || 
|-id=196 bgcolor=#E9E9E9
| 113196 ||  || — || September 5, 2002 || Socorro || LINEAR || 526 || align=right | 4.1 km || 
|-id=197 bgcolor=#E9E9E9
| 113197 ||  || — || September 6, 2002 || Socorro || LINEAR || — || align=right | 4.1 km || 
|-id=198 bgcolor=#d6d6d6
| 113198 ||  || — || September 6, 2002 || Socorro || LINEAR || — || align=right | 7.5 km || 
|-id=199 bgcolor=#E9E9E9
| 113199 ||  || — || September 6, 2002 || Socorro || LINEAR || — || align=right | 1.9 km || 
|-id=200 bgcolor=#fefefe
| 113200 ||  || — || September 6, 2002 || Socorro || LINEAR || — || align=right | 2.9 km || 
|}

113201–113300 

|-bgcolor=#E9E9E9
| 113201 ||  || — || September 6, 2002 || Socorro || LINEAR || — || align=right | 3.6 km || 
|-id=202 bgcolor=#d6d6d6
| 113202 Kisslászló ||  ||  || September 7, 2002 || Piszkéstető || K. Sárneczky || — || align=right | 5.4 km || 
|-id=203 bgcolor=#E9E9E9
| 113203 Szabó ||  ||  || September 7, 2002 || Piszkéstető || K. Sárneczky || — || align=right | 1.5 km || 
|-id=204 bgcolor=#d6d6d6
| 113204 ||  || — || September 5, 2002 || Socorro || LINEAR || — || align=right | 6.0 km || 
|-id=205 bgcolor=#fefefe
| 113205 ||  || — || September 7, 2002 || Farra d'Isonzo || Farra d'Isonzo || — || align=right | 2.0 km || 
|-id=206 bgcolor=#d6d6d6
| 113206 ||  || — || September 5, 2002 || Socorro || LINEAR || — || align=right | 5.5 km || 
|-id=207 bgcolor=#E9E9E9
| 113207 ||  || — || September 5, 2002 || Socorro || LINEAR || — || align=right | 3.7 km || 
|-id=208 bgcolor=#E9E9E9
| 113208 Lea ||  ||  || September 5, 2002 || Campo Imperatore || F. Bernardi || — || align=right | 3.0 km || 
|-id=209 bgcolor=#E9E9E9
| 113209 ||  || — || September 6, 2002 || Socorro || LINEAR || BRU || align=right | 5.3 km || 
|-id=210 bgcolor=#fefefe
| 113210 ||  || — || September 7, 2002 || Ondřejov || P. Pravec, P. Kušnirák || — || align=right | 2.0 km || 
|-id=211 bgcolor=#fefefe
| 113211 ||  || — || September 7, 2002 || Socorro || LINEAR || FLO || align=right | 1.9 km || 
|-id=212 bgcolor=#d6d6d6
| 113212 ||  || — || September 3, 2002 || Palomar || NEAT || — || align=right | 6.4 km || 
|-id=213 bgcolor=#E9E9E9
| 113213 ||  || — || September 6, 2002 || Campo Imperatore || CINEOS || — || align=right | 5.5 km || 
|-id=214 bgcolor=#d6d6d6
| 113214 Vinkó ||  ||  || September 9, 2002 || Piszkéstető || K. Sárneczky || EOS || align=right | 3.1 km || 
|-id=215 bgcolor=#fefefe
| 113215 ||  || — || September 9, 2002 || Powell || Powell Obs. || FLO || align=right | 1.3 km || 
|-id=216 bgcolor=#d6d6d6
| 113216 ||  || — || September 7, 2002 || Socorro || LINEAR || EOS || align=right | 4.5 km || 
|-id=217 bgcolor=#fefefe
| 113217 ||  || — || September 6, 2002 || Socorro || LINEAR || — || align=right | 2.0 km || 
|-id=218 bgcolor=#d6d6d6
| 113218 ||  || — || September 7, 2002 || Socorro || LINEAR || — || align=right | 5.3 km || 
|-id=219 bgcolor=#E9E9E9
| 113219 ||  || — || September 7, 2002 || Campo Imperatore || CINEOS || — || align=right | 4.4 km || 
|-id=220 bgcolor=#d6d6d6
| 113220 ||  || — || September 8, 2002 || Haleakala || NEAT || — || align=right | 6.9 km || 
|-id=221 bgcolor=#E9E9E9
| 113221 ||  || — || September 5, 2002 || Haleakala || NEAT || — || align=right | 1.9 km || 
|-id=222 bgcolor=#E9E9E9
| 113222 ||  || — || September 7, 2002 || Socorro || LINEAR || — || align=right | 2.6 km || 
|-id=223 bgcolor=#d6d6d6
| 113223 ||  || — || September 7, 2002 || Socorro || LINEAR || — || align=right | 6.8 km || 
|-id=224 bgcolor=#d6d6d6
| 113224 ||  || — || September 7, 2002 || Socorro || LINEAR || HIL3:2 || align=right | 11 km || 
|-id=225 bgcolor=#d6d6d6
| 113225 ||  || — || September 7, 2002 || Socorro || LINEAR || — || align=right | 4.4 km || 
|-id=226 bgcolor=#d6d6d6
| 113226 ||  || — || September 8, 2002 || Haleakala || NEAT || EOS || align=right | 4.2 km || 
|-id=227 bgcolor=#d6d6d6
| 113227 ||  || — || September 8, 2002 || Haleakala || NEAT || EOS || align=right | 4.0 km || 
|-id=228 bgcolor=#d6d6d6
| 113228 ||  || — || September 8, 2002 || Haleakala || NEAT || — || align=right | 6.8 km || 
|-id=229 bgcolor=#d6d6d6
| 113229 ||  || — || September 8, 2002 || Haleakala || NEAT || EOS || align=right | 4.2 km || 
|-id=230 bgcolor=#d6d6d6
| 113230 ||  || — || September 8, 2002 || Haleakala || NEAT || EOS || align=right | 5.1 km || 
|-id=231 bgcolor=#d6d6d6
| 113231 ||  || — || September 8, 2002 || Haleakala || NEAT || — || align=right | 7.8 km || 
|-id=232 bgcolor=#E9E9E9
| 113232 ||  || — || September 8, 2002 || Haleakala || NEAT || RAF || align=right | 1.8 km || 
|-id=233 bgcolor=#d6d6d6
| 113233 ||  || — || September 8, 2002 || Haleakala || NEAT || — || align=right | 7.7 km || 
|-id=234 bgcolor=#fefefe
| 113234 ||  || — || September 8, 2002 || Haleakala || NEAT || — || align=right | 1.9 km || 
|-id=235 bgcolor=#d6d6d6
| 113235 ||  || — || September 9, 2002 || Haleakala || NEAT || — || align=right | 3.8 km || 
|-id=236 bgcolor=#fefefe
| 113236 ||  || — || September 4, 2002 || Palomar || NEAT || PHO || align=right | 2.5 km || 
|-id=237 bgcolor=#E9E9E9
| 113237 ||  || — || September 8, 2002 || Campo Imperatore || CINEOS || — || align=right | 2.4 km || 
|-id=238 bgcolor=#E9E9E9
| 113238 ||  || — || September 9, 2002 || Palomar || NEAT || — || align=right | 2.0 km || 
|-id=239 bgcolor=#fefefe
| 113239 ||  || — || September 9, 2002 || Palomar || NEAT || V || align=right | 1.2 km || 
|-id=240 bgcolor=#d6d6d6
| 113240 ||  || — || September 9, 2002 || Palomar || NEAT || EOS || align=right | 5.3 km || 
|-id=241 bgcolor=#E9E9E9
| 113241 ||  || — || September 10, 2002 || Palomar || NEAT || HNS || align=right | 2.2 km || 
|-id=242 bgcolor=#d6d6d6
| 113242 ||  || — || September 10, 2002 || Palomar || NEAT || — || align=right | 7.7 km || 
|-id=243 bgcolor=#E9E9E9
| 113243 ||  || — || September 10, 2002 || Palomar || NEAT || — || align=right | 5.5 km || 
|-id=244 bgcolor=#fefefe
| 113244 ||  || — || September 10, 2002 || Haleakala || NEAT || V || align=right data-sort-value="0.98" | 980 m || 
|-id=245 bgcolor=#E9E9E9
| 113245 ||  || — || September 10, 2002 || Palomar || NEAT || — || align=right | 5.0 km || 
|-id=246 bgcolor=#fefefe
| 113246 ||  || — || September 11, 2002 || Palomar || NEAT || FLO || align=right | 1.1 km || 
|-id=247 bgcolor=#fefefe
| 113247 ||  || — || September 11, 2002 || Palomar || NEAT || — || align=right | 1.8 km || 
|-id=248 bgcolor=#fefefe
| 113248 ||  || — || September 9, 2002 || Haleakala || NEAT || V || align=right | 1.4 km || 
|-id=249 bgcolor=#E9E9E9
| 113249 ||  || — || September 9, 2002 || Haleakala || NEAT || ADE || align=right | 3.7 km || 
|-id=250 bgcolor=#fefefe
| 113250 ||  || — || September 10, 2002 || Palomar || NEAT || V || align=right | 1.4 km || 
|-id=251 bgcolor=#E9E9E9
| 113251 ||  || — || September 10, 2002 || Palomar || NEAT || — || align=right | 3.1 km || 
|-id=252 bgcolor=#d6d6d6
| 113252 ||  || — || September 10, 2002 || Palomar || NEAT || — || align=right | 8.5 km || 
|-id=253 bgcolor=#E9E9E9
| 113253 ||  || — || September 10, 2002 || Palomar || NEAT || — || align=right | 5.3 km || 
|-id=254 bgcolor=#d6d6d6
| 113254 ||  || — || September 10, 2002 || Palomar || NEAT || — || align=right | 8.4 km || 
|-id=255 bgcolor=#d6d6d6
| 113255 ||  || — || September 12, 2002 || Haleakala || NEAT || — || align=right | 5.5 km || 
|-id=256 bgcolor=#E9E9E9
| 113256 Prüm ||  ||  || September 13, 2002 || Hoher List || E. W. Elst || — || align=right | 5.2 km || 
|-id=257 bgcolor=#d6d6d6
| 113257 ||  || — || September 10, 2002 || Palomar || NEAT || EOS || align=right | 4.0 km || 
|-id=258 bgcolor=#E9E9E9
| 113258 ||  || — || September 10, 2002 || Palomar || NEAT || — || align=right | 5.4 km || 
|-id=259 bgcolor=#E9E9E9
| 113259 ||  || — || September 10, 2002 || Palomar || NEAT || — || align=right | 2.8 km || 
|-id=260 bgcolor=#d6d6d6
| 113260 ||  || — || September 10, 2002 || Palomar || NEAT || — || align=right | 10 km || 
|-id=261 bgcolor=#E9E9E9
| 113261 ||  || — || September 10, 2002 || Palomar || NEAT || — || align=right | 3.9 km || 
|-id=262 bgcolor=#d6d6d6
| 113262 ||  || — || September 11, 2002 || Palomar || NEAT || EOS || align=right | 4.7 km || 
|-id=263 bgcolor=#d6d6d6
| 113263 ||  || — || September 11, 2002 || Palomar || NEAT || KOR || align=right | 2.6 km || 
|-id=264 bgcolor=#E9E9E9
| 113264 ||  || — || September 11, 2002 || Haleakala || NEAT || — || align=right | 4.0 km || 
|-id=265 bgcolor=#fefefe
| 113265 ||  || — || September 11, 2002 || Haleakala || NEAT || FLO || align=right | 1.5 km || 
|-id=266 bgcolor=#d6d6d6
| 113266 ||  || — || September 11, 2002 || Haleakala || NEAT || — || align=right | 6.7 km || 
|-id=267 bgcolor=#d6d6d6
| 113267 ||  || — || September 12, 2002 || Palomar || NEAT || SYL7:4 || align=right | 12 km || 
|-id=268 bgcolor=#d6d6d6
| 113268 ||  || — || September 12, 2002 || Palomar || NEAT || EOS || align=right | 3.6 km || 
|-id=269 bgcolor=#d6d6d6
| 113269 ||  || — || September 12, 2002 || Palomar || NEAT || — || align=right | 5.3 km || 
|-id=270 bgcolor=#d6d6d6
| 113270 ||  || — || September 12, 2002 || Palomar || NEAT || VER || align=right | 7.2 km || 
|-id=271 bgcolor=#E9E9E9
| 113271 ||  || — || September 12, 2002 || Palomar || NEAT || GEF || align=right | 2.2 km || 
|-id=272 bgcolor=#fefefe
| 113272 ||  || — || September 10, 2002 || Haleakala || NEAT || V || align=right | 1.2 km || 
|-id=273 bgcolor=#d6d6d6
| 113273 ||  || — || September 10, 2002 || Haleakala || NEAT || — || align=right | 6.1 km || 
|-id=274 bgcolor=#d6d6d6
| 113274 ||  || — || September 10, 2002 || Haleakala || NEAT || EOS || align=right | 4.1 km || 
|-id=275 bgcolor=#d6d6d6
| 113275 ||  || — || September 10, 2002 || Haleakala || NEAT || EOS || align=right | 3.9 km || 
|-id=276 bgcolor=#d6d6d6
| 113276 ||  || — || September 11, 2002 || Palomar || NEAT || — || align=right | 6.7 km || 
|-id=277 bgcolor=#E9E9E9
| 113277 ||  || — || September 11, 2002 || Palomar || NEAT || — || align=right | 2.3 km || 
|-id=278 bgcolor=#E9E9E9
| 113278 ||  || — || September 11, 2002 || Haleakala || NEAT || — || align=right | 2.3 km || 
|-id=279 bgcolor=#d6d6d6
| 113279 ||  || — || September 11, 2002 || Haleakala || NEAT || HYG || align=right | 6.1 km || 
|-id=280 bgcolor=#d6d6d6
| 113280 ||  || — || September 11, 2002 || Haleakala || NEAT || KOR || align=right | 2.4 km || 
|-id=281 bgcolor=#d6d6d6
| 113281 ||  || — || September 12, 2002 || Palomar || NEAT || THM || align=right | 4.1 km || 
|-id=282 bgcolor=#d6d6d6
| 113282 ||  || — || September 12, 2002 || Palomar || NEAT || — || align=right | 6.8 km || 
|-id=283 bgcolor=#d6d6d6
| 113283 ||  || — || September 12, 2002 || Palomar || NEAT || VER || align=right | 7.4 km || 
|-id=284 bgcolor=#E9E9E9
| 113284 ||  || — || September 12, 2002 || Palomar || NEAT || — || align=right | 1.9 km || 
|-id=285 bgcolor=#E9E9E9
| 113285 ||  || — || September 12, 2002 || Palomar || NEAT || — || align=right | 2.1 km || 
|-id=286 bgcolor=#d6d6d6
| 113286 ||  || — || September 13, 2002 || Socorro || LINEAR || — || align=right | 6.4 km || 
|-id=287 bgcolor=#fefefe
| 113287 ||  || — || September 13, 2002 || Palomar || NEAT || FLO || align=right | 1.4 km || 
|-id=288 bgcolor=#E9E9E9
| 113288 ||  || — || September 13, 2002 || Socorro || LINEAR || — || align=right | 1.9 km || 
|-id=289 bgcolor=#E9E9E9
| 113289 ||  || — || September 13, 2002 || Socorro || LINEAR || — || align=right | 3.9 km || 
|-id=290 bgcolor=#E9E9E9
| 113290 ||  || — || September 13, 2002 || Anderson Mesa || LONEOS || — || align=right | 3.7 km || 
|-id=291 bgcolor=#d6d6d6
| 113291 ||  || — || September 13, 2002 || Palomar || NEAT || — || align=right | 5.8 km || 
|-id=292 bgcolor=#E9E9E9
| 113292 ||  || — || September 13, 2002 || Socorro || LINEAR || MAR || align=right | 2.4 km || 
|-id=293 bgcolor=#d6d6d6
| 113293 ||  || — || September 13, 2002 || Socorro || LINEAR || EOS || align=right | 3.9 km || 
|-id=294 bgcolor=#d6d6d6
| 113294 ||  || — || September 13, 2002 || Palomar || NEAT || — || align=right | 4.9 km || 
|-id=295 bgcolor=#fefefe
| 113295 ||  || — || September 13, 2002 || Palomar || NEAT || V || align=right | 1.5 km || 
|-id=296 bgcolor=#d6d6d6
| 113296 ||  || — || September 13, 2002 || Palomar || NEAT || EOS || align=right | 6.0 km || 
|-id=297 bgcolor=#E9E9E9
| 113297 ||  || — || September 14, 2002 || Palomar || NEAT || — || align=right | 2.6 km || 
|-id=298 bgcolor=#E9E9E9
| 113298 ||  || — || September 14, 2002 || Palomar || NEAT || — || align=right | 4.4 km || 
|-id=299 bgcolor=#d6d6d6
| 113299 ||  || — || September 11, 2002 || Palomar || NEAT || — || align=right | 12 km || 
|-id=300 bgcolor=#d6d6d6
| 113300 ||  || — || September 11, 2002 || Palomar || NEAT || — || align=right | 7.0 km || 
|}

113301–113400 

|-bgcolor=#d6d6d6
| 113301 ||  || — || September 11, 2002 || Palomar || NEAT || — || align=right | 4.5 km || 
|-id=302 bgcolor=#E9E9E9
| 113302 ||  || — || September 12, 2002 || Palomar || NEAT || — || align=right | 2.0 km || 
|-id=303 bgcolor=#d6d6d6
| 113303 ||  || — || September 12, 2002 || Palomar || NEAT || — || align=right | 7.5 km || 
|-id=304 bgcolor=#E9E9E9
| 113304 ||  || — || September 12, 2002 || Palomar || NEAT || — || align=right | 2.7 km || 
|-id=305 bgcolor=#E9E9E9
| 113305 ||  || — || September 12, 2002 || Palomar || NEAT || — || align=right | 6.4 km || 
|-id=306 bgcolor=#E9E9E9
| 113306 ||  || — || September 12, 2002 || Palomar || NEAT || — || align=right | 4.2 km || 
|-id=307 bgcolor=#d6d6d6
| 113307 ||  || — || September 12, 2002 || Palomar || NEAT || BRA || align=right | 4.1 km || 
|-id=308 bgcolor=#fefefe
| 113308 ||  || — || September 11, 2002 || Kvistaberg || UDAS || — || align=right | 4.1 km || 
|-id=309 bgcolor=#fefefe
| 113309 ||  || — || September 11, 2002 || Kvistaberg || UDAS || — || align=right | 1.6 km || 
|-id=310 bgcolor=#fefefe
| 113310 ||  || — || September 12, 2002 || Palomar || NEAT || — || align=right | 1.2 km || 
|-id=311 bgcolor=#E9E9E9
| 113311 ||  || — || September 14, 2002 || Palomar || NEAT || — || align=right | 4.8 km || 
|-id=312 bgcolor=#fefefe
| 113312 ||  || — || September 14, 2002 || Palomar || NEAT || — || align=right data-sort-value="0.96" | 960 m || 
|-id=313 bgcolor=#E9E9E9
| 113313 ||  || — || September 14, 2002 || Palomar || NEAT || — || align=right | 1.7 km || 
|-id=314 bgcolor=#d6d6d6
| 113314 ||  || — || September 12, 2002 || Palomar || NEAT || — || align=right | 5.9 km || 
|-id=315 bgcolor=#fefefe
| 113315 ||  || — || September 12, 2002 || Haleakala || NEAT || — || align=right | 2.0 km || 
|-id=316 bgcolor=#E9E9E9
| 113316 ||  || — || September 13, 2002 || Palomar || NEAT || — || align=right | 3.6 km || 
|-id=317 bgcolor=#d6d6d6
| 113317 ||  || — || September 13, 2002 || Palomar || NEAT || SYL7:4 || align=right | 13 km || 
|-id=318 bgcolor=#d6d6d6
| 113318 ||  || — || September 13, 2002 || Socorro || LINEAR || — || align=right | 4.3 km || 
|-id=319 bgcolor=#d6d6d6
| 113319 ||  || — || September 13, 2002 || Socorro || LINEAR || HYG || align=right | 5.5 km || 
|-id=320 bgcolor=#E9E9E9
| 113320 ||  || — || September 14, 2002 || Palomar || NEAT || — || align=right | 3.6 km || 
|-id=321 bgcolor=#E9E9E9
| 113321 ||  || — || September 14, 2002 || Palomar || NEAT || — || align=right | 1.6 km || 
|-id=322 bgcolor=#fefefe
| 113322 ||  || — || September 14, 2002 || Haleakala || NEAT || — || align=right | 1.8 km || 
|-id=323 bgcolor=#E9E9E9
| 113323 ||  || — || September 14, 2002 || Haleakala || NEAT || — || align=right | 6.3 km || 
|-id=324 bgcolor=#fefefe
| 113324 ||  || — || September 14, 2002 || Haleakala || NEAT || MAS || align=right | 1.3 km || 
|-id=325 bgcolor=#d6d6d6
| 113325 ||  || — || September 14, 2002 || Haleakala || NEAT || — || align=right | 5.0 km || 
|-id=326 bgcolor=#E9E9E9
| 113326 ||  || — || September 14, 2002 || Haleakala || NEAT || — || align=right | 3.1 km || 
|-id=327 bgcolor=#E9E9E9
| 113327 ||  || — || September 14, 2002 || Palomar || NEAT || — || align=right | 1.8 km || 
|-id=328 bgcolor=#d6d6d6
| 113328 ||  || — || September 14, 2002 || Palomar || NEAT || KOR || align=right | 2.7 km || 
|-id=329 bgcolor=#d6d6d6
| 113329 ||  || — || September 14, 2002 || Palomar || NEAT || THM || align=right | 4.3 km || 
|-id=330 bgcolor=#d6d6d6
| 113330 ||  || — || September 14, 2002 || Palomar || NEAT || — || align=right | 4.7 km || 
|-id=331 bgcolor=#d6d6d6
| 113331 ||  || — || September 14, 2002 || Haleakala || NEAT || THM || align=right | 3.9 km || 
|-id=332 bgcolor=#E9E9E9
| 113332 ||  || — || September 14, 2002 || Haleakala || NEAT || MIT || align=right | 4.8 km || 
|-id=333 bgcolor=#d6d6d6
| 113333 Tyler ||  ||  || September 13, 2002 || Goodricke-Pigott || R. A. Tucker || — || align=right | 4.9 km || 
|-id=334 bgcolor=#d6d6d6
| 113334 ||  || — || September 12, 2002 || Haleakala || NEAT || EOS || align=right | 4.6 km || 
|-id=335 bgcolor=#fefefe
| 113335 ||  || — || September 13, 2002 || Palomar || NEAT || — || align=right | 1.6 km || 
|-id=336 bgcolor=#E9E9E9
| 113336 ||  || — || September 13, 2002 || Socorro || LINEAR || — || align=right | 3.3 km || 
|-id=337 bgcolor=#d6d6d6
| 113337 ||  || — || September 13, 2002 || Socorro || LINEAR || EOS || align=right | 7.1 km || 
|-id=338 bgcolor=#E9E9E9
| 113338 ||  || — || September 13, 2002 || Socorro || LINEAR || PAD || align=right | 6.3 km || 
|-id=339 bgcolor=#E9E9E9
| 113339 ||  || — || September 13, 2002 || Haleakala || NEAT || — || align=right | 3.9 km || 
|-id=340 bgcolor=#fefefe
| 113340 ||  || — || September 14, 2002 || Palomar || NEAT || — || align=right | 1.4 km || 
|-id=341 bgcolor=#E9E9E9
| 113341 ||  || — || September 15, 2002 || Palomar || NEAT || — || align=right | 3.0 km || 
|-id=342 bgcolor=#E9E9E9
| 113342 ||  || — || September 15, 2002 || Palomar || NEAT || NEM || align=right | 3.6 km || 
|-id=343 bgcolor=#d6d6d6
| 113343 ||  || — || September 13, 2002 || Haleakala || NEAT || HYG || align=right | 7.5 km || 
|-id=344 bgcolor=#E9E9E9
| 113344 ||  || — || September 14, 2002 || Palomar || NEAT || — || align=right | 4.9 km || 
|-id=345 bgcolor=#E9E9E9
| 113345 ||  || — || September 14, 2002 || Haleakala || NEAT || — || align=right | 4.4 km || 
|-id=346 bgcolor=#E9E9E9
| 113346 ||  || — || September 14, 2002 || Palomar || R. Matson || — || align=right | 4.8 km || 
|-id=347 bgcolor=#d6d6d6
| 113347 ||  || — || September 14, 2002 || Palomar || R. Matson || LIX || align=right | 5.8 km || 
|-id=348 bgcolor=#d6d6d6
| 113348 ||  || — || September 14, 2002 || Palomar || R. Matson || — || align=right | 3.0 km || 
|-id=349 bgcolor=#d6d6d6
| 113349 ||  || — || September 15, 2002 || Palomar || R. Matson || — || align=right | 4.0 km || 
|-id=350 bgcolor=#E9E9E9
| 113350 ||  || — || September 14, 2002 || Palomar || R. Matson || HEN || align=right | 1.7 km || 
|-id=351 bgcolor=#d6d6d6
| 113351 ||  || — || September 14, 2002 || Palomar || R. Matson || HYG || align=right | 2.8 km || 
|-id=352 bgcolor=#E9E9E9
| 113352 ||  || — || September 14, 2002 || Haleakala || R. Matson || — || align=right | 2.2 km || 
|-id=353 bgcolor=#E9E9E9
| 113353 ||  || — || September 9, 2002 || Haleakala || R. Matson || — || align=right | 1.3 km || 
|-id=354 bgcolor=#E9E9E9
| 113354 ||  || — || September 1, 2002 || Haleakala || R. Matson || — || align=right | 1.4 km || 
|-id=355 bgcolor=#d6d6d6
| 113355 Gessler ||  ||  || September 14, 2002 || Palomar || R. Matson || — || align=right | 3.7 km || 
|-id=356 bgcolor=#E9E9E9
| 113356 ||  || — || September 14, 2002 || Palomar || NEAT || — || align=right | 1.3 km || 
|-id=357 bgcolor=#d6d6d6
| 113357 ||  || — || September 1, 2002 || Palomar || NEAT || — || align=right | 3.8 km || 
|-id=358 bgcolor=#d6d6d6
| 113358 ||  || — || September 1, 2002 || Palomar || NEAT || — || align=right | 3.2 km || 
|-id=359 bgcolor=#fefefe
| 113359 ||  || — || September 1, 2002 || Palomar || NEAT || NYS || align=right data-sort-value="0.99" | 990 m || 
|-id=360 bgcolor=#fefefe
| 113360 ||  || — || September 26, 2002 || Palomar || NEAT || MAS || align=right data-sort-value="0.95" | 950 m || 
|-id=361 bgcolor=#d6d6d6
| 113361 ||  || — || September 26, 2002 || Haleakala || NEAT || — || align=right | 9.0 km || 
|-id=362 bgcolor=#E9E9E9
| 113362 ||  || — || September 26, 2002 || Palomar || NEAT || PAD || align=right | 2.6 km || 
|-id=363 bgcolor=#E9E9E9
| 113363 ||  || — || September 26, 2002 || Palomar || NEAT || — || align=right | 3.5 km || 
|-id=364 bgcolor=#fefefe
| 113364 ||  || — || September 26, 2002 || Palomar || NEAT || NYS || align=right | 1.7 km || 
|-id=365 bgcolor=#E9E9E9
| 113365 ||  || — || September 26, 2002 || Palomar || NEAT || GEF || align=right | 2.9 km || 
|-id=366 bgcolor=#E9E9E9
| 113366 ||  || — || September 27, 2002 || Palomar || NEAT || HNS || align=right | 2.6 km || 
|-id=367 bgcolor=#d6d6d6
| 113367 ||  || — || September 27, 2002 || Palomar || NEAT || EUP || align=right | 8.1 km || 
|-id=368 bgcolor=#d6d6d6
| 113368 ||  || — || September 27, 2002 || Palomar || NEAT || ALA || align=right | 9.5 km || 
|-id=369 bgcolor=#E9E9E9
| 113369 ||  || — || September 26, 2002 || Palomar || NEAT || HEN || align=right | 1.3 km || 
|-id=370 bgcolor=#E9E9E9
| 113370 ||  || — || September 26, 2002 || Palomar || NEAT || — || align=right | 3.7 km || 
|-id=371 bgcolor=#d6d6d6
| 113371 ||  || — || September 27, 2002 || Palomar || NEAT || — || align=right | 6.6 km || 
|-id=372 bgcolor=#fefefe
| 113372 ||  || — || September 27, 2002 || Palomar || NEAT || — || align=right | 1.2 km || 
|-id=373 bgcolor=#d6d6d6
| 113373 ||  || — || September 27, 2002 || Palomar || NEAT || — || align=right | 5.1 km || 
|-id=374 bgcolor=#fefefe
| 113374 ||  || — || September 27, 2002 || Palomar || NEAT || SUL || align=right | 3.6 km || 
|-id=375 bgcolor=#E9E9E9
| 113375 ||  || — || September 27, 2002 || Palomar || NEAT || JUN || align=right | 2.6 km || 
|-id=376 bgcolor=#d6d6d6
| 113376 ||  || — || September 27, 2002 || Palomar || NEAT || — || align=right | 4.6 km || 
|-id=377 bgcolor=#fefefe
| 113377 ||  || — || September 27, 2002 || Palomar || NEAT || — || align=right | 1.3 km || 
|-id=378 bgcolor=#d6d6d6
| 113378 ||  || — || September 27, 2002 || Palomar || NEAT || KOR || align=right | 2.6 km || 
|-id=379 bgcolor=#E9E9E9
| 113379 ||  || — || September 27, 2002 || Palomar || NEAT || — || align=right | 2.9 km || 
|-id=380 bgcolor=#E9E9E9
| 113380 ||  || — || September 27, 2002 || Palomar || NEAT || — || align=right | 1.5 km || 
|-id=381 bgcolor=#fefefe
| 113381 ||  || — || September 27, 2002 || Palomar || NEAT || MAS || align=right | 1.8 km || 
|-id=382 bgcolor=#E9E9E9
| 113382 ||  || — || September 27, 2002 || Palomar || NEAT || — || align=right | 2.5 km || 
|-id=383 bgcolor=#E9E9E9
| 113383 ||  || — || September 27, 2002 || Anderson Mesa || LONEOS || — || align=right | 2.6 km || 
|-id=384 bgcolor=#E9E9E9
| 113384 ||  || — || September 27, 2002 || Palomar || NEAT || — || align=right | 3.6 km || 
|-id=385 bgcolor=#d6d6d6
| 113385 ||  || — || September 27, 2002 || Palomar || NEAT || — || align=right | 11 km || 
|-id=386 bgcolor=#E9E9E9
| 113386 ||  || — || September 27, 2002 || Palomar || NEAT || JUN || align=right | 3.4 km || 
|-id=387 bgcolor=#d6d6d6
| 113387 ||  || — || September 27, 2002 || Palomar || NEAT || ALA || align=right | 7.0 km || 
|-id=388 bgcolor=#d6d6d6
| 113388 Davidmartinez ||  ||  || September 28, 2002 || Pla D'Arguines || R. Ferrando || HYG || align=right | 5.7 km || 
|-id=389 bgcolor=#d6d6d6
| 113389 ||  || — || September 28, 2002 || Ondřejov || Ondřejov Obs. || — || align=right | 4.1 km || 
|-id=390 bgcolor=#fefefe
| 113390 Helvetia ||  ||  || September 29, 2002 || Winterthur || M. Griesser || — || align=right | 2.2 km || 
|-id=391 bgcolor=#E9E9E9
| 113391 ||  || — || September 26, 2002 || Palomar || NEAT || — || align=right | 2.5 km || 
|-id=392 bgcolor=#d6d6d6
| 113392 ||  || — || September 26, 2002 || Palomar || NEAT || — || align=right | 5.0 km || 
|-id=393 bgcolor=#d6d6d6
| 113393 ||  || — || September 26, 2002 || Palomar || NEAT || — || align=right | 4.8 km || 
|-id=394 bgcolor=#E9E9E9
| 113394 Niebur ||  ||  || September 26, 2002 || Palomar || NEAT || — || align=right | 3.5 km || 
|-id=395 bgcolor=#E9E9E9
| 113395 Curtniebur ||  ||  || September 26, 2002 || Palomar || NEAT || WIT || align=right | 2.4 km || 
|-id=396 bgcolor=#E9E9E9
| 113396 ||  || — || September 26, 2002 || Palomar || NEAT || — || align=right | 2.3 km || 
|-id=397 bgcolor=#d6d6d6
| 113397 ||  || — || September 26, 2002 || Palomar || NEAT || KOR || align=right | 2.9 km || 
|-id=398 bgcolor=#d6d6d6
| 113398 ||  || — || September 26, 2002 || Palomar || NEAT || THM || align=right | 6.2 km || 
|-id=399 bgcolor=#fefefe
| 113399 ||  || — || September 26, 2002 || Palomar || NEAT || — || align=right | 1.4 km || 
|-id=400 bgcolor=#d6d6d6
| 113400 ||  || — || September 26, 2002 || Haleakala || NEAT || — || align=right | 7.1 km || 
|}

113401–113500 

|-bgcolor=#d6d6d6
| 113401 ||  || — || September 26, 2002 || Haleakala || NEAT || — || align=right | 4.7 km || 
|-id=402 bgcolor=#d6d6d6
| 113402 ||  || — || September 26, 2002 || Haleakala || NEAT || EOS || align=right | 4.2 km || 
|-id=403 bgcolor=#d6d6d6
| 113403 ||  || — || September 27, 2002 || Anderson Mesa || LONEOS || 3:2 || align=right | 10 km || 
|-id=404 bgcolor=#E9E9E9
| 113404 ||  || — || September 27, 2002 || Socorro || LINEAR || EUN || align=right | 3.3 km || 
|-id=405 bgcolor=#E9E9E9
| 113405 Itomori ||  ||  || September 28, 2002 || Goodricke-Pigott || R. A. Tucker || KRM || align=right | 4.2 km || 
|-id=406 bgcolor=#d6d6d6
| 113406 ||  || — || September 28, 2002 || Palomar || NEAT || LUT || align=right | 8.6 km || 
|-id=407 bgcolor=#E9E9E9
| 113407 ||  || — || September 28, 2002 || Haleakala || NEAT || — || align=right | 4.7 km || 
|-id=408 bgcolor=#d6d6d6
| 113408 ||  || — || September 28, 2002 || Haleakala || NEAT || — || align=right | 6.6 km || 
|-id=409 bgcolor=#E9E9E9
| 113409 ||  || — || September 28, 2002 || Haleakala || NEAT || MAR || align=right | 2.7 km || 
|-id=410 bgcolor=#E9E9E9
| 113410 ||  || — || September 28, 2002 || Haleakala || NEAT || — || align=right | 1.8 km || 
|-id=411 bgcolor=#d6d6d6
| 113411 ||  || — || September 28, 2002 || Haleakala || NEAT || HYG || align=right | 4.7 km || 
|-id=412 bgcolor=#E9E9E9
| 113412 ||  || — || September 28, 2002 || Haleakala || NEAT || — || align=right | 3.8 km || 
|-id=413 bgcolor=#E9E9E9
| 113413 ||  || — || September 29, 2002 || Haleakala || NEAT || — || align=right | 2.3 km || 
|-id=414 bgcolor=#d6d6d6
| 113414 ||  || — || September 29, 2002 || Haleakala || NEAT || — || align=right | 4.2 km || 
|-id=415 bgcolor=#d6d6d6
| 113415 Rauracia ||  ||  || September 30, 2002 || Vicques || M. Ory || 3:2 || align=right | 9.1 km || 
|-id=416 bgcolor=#fefefe
| 113416 ||  || — || September 28, 2002 || Palomar || NEAT || NYS || align=right | 1.2 km || 
|-id=417 bgcolor=#d6d6d6
| 113417 ||  || — || September 28, 2002 || Haleakala || NEAT || EOS || align=right | 3.4 km || 
|-id=418 bgcolor=#d6d6d6
| 113418 ||  || — || September 28, 2002 || Haleakala || NEAT || — || align=right | 4.9 km || 
|-id=419 bgcolor=#E9E9E9
| 113419 ||  || — || September 28, 2002 || Haleakala || NEAT || AGN || align=right | 2.9 km || 
|-id=420 bgcolor=#E9E9E9
| 113420 ||  || — || September 29, 2002 || Haleakala || NEAT || — || align=right | 2.2 km || 
|-id=421 bgcolor=#E9E9E9
| 113421 ||  || — || September 29, 2002 || Haleakala || NEAT || — || align=right | 4.3 km || 
|-id=422 bgcolor=#d6d6d6
| 113422 ||  || — || September 29, 2002 || Haleakala || NEAT || VER || align=right | 5.8 km || 
|-id=423 bgcolor=#E9E9E9
| 113423 ||  || — || September 29, 2002 || Haleakala || NEAT || MRX || align=right | 2.0 km || 
|-id=424 bgcolor=#d6d6d6
| 113424 ||  || — || September 29, 2002 || Haleakala || NEAT || KOR || align=right | 3.5 km || 
|-id=425 bgcolor=#d6d6d6
| 113425 ||  || — || September 29, 2002 || Haleakala || NEAT || — || align=right | 3.8 km || 
|-id=426 bgcolor=#d6d6d6
| 113426 ||  || — || September 29, 2002 || Haleakala || NEAT || — || align=right | 4.1 km || 
|-id=427 bgcolor=#E9E9E9
| 113427 ||  || — || September 29, 2002 || Haleakala || NEAT || GEF || align=right | 2.4 km || 
|-id=428 bgcolor=#d6d6d6
| 113428 ||  || — || September 30, 2002 || Socorro || LINEAR || — || align=right | 5.6 km || 
|-id=429 bgcolor=#E9E9E9
| 113429 ||  || — || September 30, 2002 || Socorro || LINEAR || MRX || align=right | 2.4 km || 
|-id=430 bgcolor=#d6d6d6
| 113430 ||  || — || September 30, 2002 || Socorro || LINEAR || — || align=right | 7.3 km || 
|-id=431 bgcolor=#E9E9E9
| 113431 ||  || — || September 30, 2002 || Socorro || LINEAR || — || align=right | 3.9 km || 
|-id=432 bgcolor=#d6d6d6
| 113432 ||  || — || September 30, 2002 || Socorro || LINEAR || — || align=right | 4.2 km || 
|-id=433 bgcolor=#fefefe
| 113433 ||  || — || September 30, 2002 || Haleakala || NEAT || — || align=right | 1.8 km || 
|-id=434 bgcolor=#E9E9E9
| 113434 ||  || — || September 30, 2002 || Socorro || LINEAR || — || align=right | 1.9 km || 
|-id=435 bgcolor=#E9E9E9
| 113435 ||  || — || September 30, 2002 || Haleakala || NEAT || — || align=right | 5.5 km || 
|-id=436 bgcolor=#E9E9E9
| 113436 ||  || — || September 30, 2002 || Haleakala || NEAT || RAF || align=right | 1.6 km || 
|-id=437 bgcolor=#d6d6d6
| 113437 ||  || — || September 30, 2002 || Haleakala || NEAT || — || align=right | 5.1 km || 
|-id=438 bgcolor=#E9E9E9
| 113438 ||  || — || September 30, 2002 || Haleakala || NEAT || — || align=right | 3.1 km || 
|-id=439 bgcolor=#E9E9E9
| 113439 ||  || — || September 28, 2002 || Palomar || NEAT || HEN || align=right | 1.8 km || 
|-id=440 bgcolor=#E9E9E9
| 113440 ||  || — || September 28, 2002 || Haleakala || NEAT || — || align=right | 4.7 km || 
|-id=441 bgcolor=#d6d6d6
| 113441 ||  || — || September 29, 2002 || Haleakala || NEAT || EOS || align=right | 3.9 km || 
|-id=442 bgcolor=#E9E9E9
| 113442 ||  || — || September 29, 2002 || Haleakala || NEAT || HEN || align=right | 2.1 km || 
|-id=443 bgcolor=#E9E9E9
| 113443 ||  || — || September 29, 2002 || Haleakala || NEAT || HOF || align=right | 5.0 km || 
|-id=444 bgcolor=#E9E9E9
| 113444 ||  || — || September 29, 2002 || Haleakala || NEAT || — || align=right | 4.8 km || 
|-id=445 bgcolor=#fefefe
| 113445 ||  || — || September 29, 2002 || Haleakala || NEAT || — || align=right | 1.3 km || 
|-id=446 bgcolor=#fefefe
| 113446 ||  || — || September 29, 2002 || Haleakala || NEAT || NYS || align=right | 1.2 km || 
|-id=447 bgcolor=#E9E9E9
| 113447 ||  || — || September 29, 2002 || Kitt Peak || Spacewatch || — || align=right | 4.9 km || 
|-id=448 bgcolor=#d6d6d6
| 113448 ||  || — || September 29, 2002 || Haleakala || NEAT || — || align=right | 4.2 km || 
|-id=449 bgcolor=#d6d6d6
| 113449 ||  || — || September 29, 2002 || Haleakala || NEAT || HYG || align=right | 6.8 km || 
|-id=450 bgcolor=#d6d6d6
| 113450 ||  || — || September 29, 2002 || Haleakala || NEAT || EOS || align=right | 4.6 km || 
|-id=451 bgcolor=#E9E9E9
| 113451 ||  || — || September 29, 2002 || Haleakala || NEAT || — || align=right | 5.3 km || 
|-id=452 bgcolor=#fefefe
| 113452 ||  || — || September 30, 2002 || Socorro || LINEAR || NYS || align=right | 1.2 km || 
|-id=453 bgcolor=#E9E9E9
| 113453 ||  || — || September 30, 2002 || Socorro || LINEAR || — || align=right | 1.9 km || 
|-id=454 bgcolor=#E9E9E9
| 113454 ||  || — || September 30, 2002 || Socorro || LINEAR || — || align=right | 2.8 km || 
|-id=455 bgcolor=#fefefe
| 113455 ||  || — || September 30, 2002 || Socorro || LINEAR || — || align=right | 1.3 km || 
|-id=456 bgcolor=#d6d6d6
| 113456 ||  || — || September 30, 2002 || Socorro || LINEAR || KOR || align=right | 2.8 km || 
|-id=457 bgcolor=#E9E9E9
| 113457 ||  || — || September 30, 2002 || Socorro || LINEAR || MAR || align=right | 2.6 km || 
|-id=458 bgcolor=#fefefe
| 113458 ||  || — || September 30, 2002 || Socorro || LINEAR || FLO || align=right | 1.2 km || 
|-id=459 bgcolor=#fefefe
| 113459 ||  || — || September 30, 2002 || Haleakala || NEAT || — || align=right | 1.3 km || 
|-id=460 bgcolor=#fefefe
| 113460 ||  || — || September 30, 2002 || Socorro || LINEAR || — || align=right | 1.5 km || 
|-id=461 bgcolor=#fefefe
| 113461 McCay ||  ||  || September 30, 2002 || Goodricke-Pigott || R. A. Tucker || FLO || align=right | 1.9 km || 
|-id=462 bgcolor=#E9E9E9
| 113462 ||  || — || September 16, 2002 || Haleakala || NEAT || — || align=right | 2.9 km || 
|-id=463 bgcolor=#fefefe
| 113463 ||  || — || September 17, 2002 || Palomar || NEAT || — || align=right | 1.7 km || 
|-id=464 bgcolor=#fefefe
| 113464 ||  || — || September 19, 2002 || Palomar || NEAT || — || align=right | 2.0 km || 
|-id=465 bgcolor=#E9E9E9
| 113465 ||  || — || September 21, 2002 || Palomar || NEAT || — || align=right | 3.6 km || 
|-id=466 bgcolor=#d6d6d6
| 113466 ||  || — || September 30, 2002 || Socorro || LINEAR || HYG || align=right | 5.4 km || 
|-id=467 bgcolor=#d6d6d6
| 113467 ||  || — || September 30, 2002 || Socorro || LINEAR || — || align=right | 5.9 km || 
|-id=468 bgcolor=#fefefe
| 113468 ||  || — || September 30, 2002 || Socorro || LINEAR || V || align=right | 1.5 km || 
|-id=469 bgcolor=#E9E9E9
| 113469 ||  || — || September 30, 2002 || Socorro || LINEAR || — || align=right | 4.6 km || 
|-id=470 bgcolor=#E9E9E9
| 113470 ||  || — || September 30, 2002 || Socorro || LINEAR || — || align=right | 2.8 km || 
|-id=471 bgcolor=#E9E9E9
| 113471 ||  || — || September 30, 2002 || Socorro || LINEAR || WIT || align=right | 1.7 km || 
|-id=472 bgcolor=#fefefe
| 113472 ||  || — || September 30, 2002 || Socorro || LINEAR || FLO || align=right | 1.2 km || 
|-id=473 bgcolor=#fefefe
| 113473 ||  || — || September 30, 2002 || Socorro || LINEAR || — || align=right | 1.9 km || 
|-id=474 bgcolor=#d6d6d6
| 113474 ||  || — || September 30, 2002 || Haleakala || NEAT || — || align=right | 6.3 km || 
|-id=475 bgcolor=#d6d6d6
| 113475 ||  || — || September 30, 2002 || Haleakala || NEAT || — || align=right | 5.8 km || 
|-id=476 bgcolor=#E9E9E9
| 113476 ||  || — || September 30, 2002 || Haleakala || NEAT || GEF || align=right | 3.7 km || 
|-id=477 bgcolor=#d6d6d6
| 113477 ||  || — || September 30, 2002 || Socorro || LINEAR || — || align=right | 4.0 km || 
|-id=478 bgcolor=#fefefe
| 113478 ||  || — || September 25, 2002 || Palomar || NEAT || NYS || align=right | 1.2 km || 
|-id=479 bgcolor=#fefefe
| 113479 || 2002 TF || — || October 1, 2002 || Haleakala || NEAT || — || align=right | 3.0 km || 
|-id=480 bgcolor=#E9E9E9
| 113480 || 2002 TH || — || October 1, 2002 || Anderson Mesa || LONEOS || — || align=right | 3.8 km || 
|-id=481 bgcolor=#d6d6d6
| 113481 || 2002 TL || — || October 1, 2002 || Anderson Mesa || LONEOS || THM || align=right | 4.3 km || 
|-id=482 bgcolor=#d6d6d6
| 113482 || 2002 TN || — || October 1, 2002 || Anderson Mesa || LONEOS || KOR || align=right | 2.9 km || 
|-id=483 bgcolor=#fefefe
| 113483 || 2002 TO || — || October 1, 2002 || Anderson Mesa || LONEOS || — || align=right | 1.4 km || 
|-id=484 bgcolor=#fefefe
| 113484 ||  || — || October 1, 2002 || Anderson Mesa || LONEOS || — || align=right | 1.7 km || 
|-id=485 bgcolor=#fefefe
| 113485 ||  || — || October 1, 2002 || Anderson Mesa || LONEOS || — || align=right | 1.5 km || 
|-id=486 bgcolor=#d6d6d6
| 113486 ||  || — || October 1, 2002 || Anderson Mesa || LONEOS || KOR || align=right | 2.6 km || 
|-id=487 bgcolor=#fefefe
| 113487 ||  || — || October 1, 2002 || Anderson Mesa || LONEOS || NYS || align=right | 1.3 km || 
|-id=488 bgcolor=#d6d6d6
| 113488 ||  || — || October 1, 2002 || Anderson Mesa || LONEOS || — || align=right | 5.1 km || 
|-id=489 bgcolor=#fefefe
| 113489 ||  || — || October 1, 2002 || Anderson Mesa || LONEOS || NYS || align=right | 1.2 km || 
|-id=490 bgcolor=#E9E9E9
| 113490 ||  || — || October 1, 2002 || Anderson Mesa || LONEOS || WIT || align=right | 2.1 km || 
|-id=491 bgcolor=#d6d6d6
| 113491 ||  || — || October 1, 2002 || Anderson Mesa || LONEOS || — || align=right | 5.8 km || 
|-id=492 bgcolor=#d6d6d6
| 113492 ||  || — || October 1, 2002 || Anderson Mesa || LONEOS || — || align=right | 5.3 km || 
|-id=493 bgcolor=#E9E9E9
| 113493 ||  || — || October 1, 2002 || Socorro || LINEAR || — || align=right | 4.1 km || 
|-id=494 bgcolor=#fefefe
| 113494 ||  || — || October 1, 2002 || Anderson Mesa || LONEOS || — || align=right | 1.1 km || 
|-id=495 bgcolor=#E9E9E9
| 113495 ||  || — || October 1, 2002 || Socorro || LINEAR || — || align=right | 3.4 km || 
|-id=496 bgcolor=#E9E9E9
| 113496 ||  || — || October 1, 2002 || Socorro || LINEAR || — || align=right | 4.8 km || 
|-id=497 bgcolor=#fefefe
| 113497 ||  || — || October 1, 2002 || Anderson Mesa || LONEOS || — || align=right | 1.3 km || 
|-id=498 bgcolor=#d6d6d6
| 113498 ||  || — || October 1, 2002 || Anderson Mesa || LONEOS || HYG || align=right | 4.7 km || 
|-id=499 bgcolor=#d6d6d6
| 113499 ||  || — || October 1, 2002 || Anderson Mesa || LONEOS || KOR || align=right | 3.0 km || 
|-id=500 bgcolor=#d6d6d6
| 113500 ||  || — || October 1, 2002 || Socorro || LINEAR || — || align=right | 8.2 km || 
|}

113501–113600 

|-bgcolor=#E9E9E9
| 113501 ||  || — || October 1, 2002 || Socorro || LINEAR || — || align=right | 4.8 km || 
|-id=502 bgcolor=#fefefe
| 113502 ||  || — || October 1, 2002 || Socorro || LINEAR || NYS || align=right | 1.3 km || 
|-id=503 bgcolor=#E9E9E9
| 113503 ||  || — || October 1, 2002 || Anderson Mesa || LONEOS || ADE || align=right | 6.7 km || 
|-id=504 bgcolor=#E9E9E9
| 113504 ||  || — || October 1, 2002 || Anderson Mesa || LONEOS || AST || align=right | 4.4 km || 
|-id=505 bgcolor=#d6d6d6
| 113505 ||  || — || October 1, 2002 || Anderson Mesa || LONEOS || — || align=right | 4.1 km || 
|-id=506 bgcolor=#fefefe
| 113506 ||  || — || October 1, 2002 || Anderson Mesa || LONEOS || — || align=right | 1.9 km || 
|-id=507 bgcolor=#d6d6d6
| 113507 ||  || — || October 1, 2002 || Haleakala || NEAT || EUPslow || align=right | 9.7 km || 
|-id=508 bgcolor=#fefefe
| 113508 ||  || — || October 1, 2002 || Haleakala || NEAT || NYS || align=right | 1.4 km || 
|-id=509 bgcolor=#d6d6d6
| 113509 ||  || — || October 1, 2002 || Haleakala || NEAT || — || align=right | 4.5 km || 
|-id=510 bgcolor=#E9E9E9
| 113510 ||  || — || October 1, 2002 || Haleakala || NEAT || HOF || align=right | 6.5 km || 
|-id=511 bgcolor=#fefefe
| 113511 ||  || — || October 1, 2002 || Anderson Mesa || LONEOS || NYS || align=right | 1.5 km || 
|-id=512 bgcolor=#d6d6d6
| 113512 ||  || — || October 1, 2002 || Anderson Mesa || LONEOS || — || align=right | 7.1 km || 
|-id=513 bgcolor=#fefefe
| 113513 ||  || — || October 1, 2002 || Anderson Mesa || LONEOS || FLO || align=right | 1.6 km || 
|-id=514 bgcolor=#fefefe
| 113514 ||  || — || October 1, 2002 || Anderson Mesa || LONEOS || — || align=right | 1.3 km || 
|-id=515 bgcolor=#d6d6d6
| 113515 ||  || — || October 1, 2002 || Anderson Mesa || LONEOS || KOR || align=right | 3.1 km || 
|-id=516 bgcolor=#fefefe
| 113516 ||  || — || October 1, 2002 || Socorro || LINEAR || — || align=right | 1.5 km || 
|-id=517 bgcolor=#d6d6d6
| 113517 ||  || — || October 1, 2002 || Socorro || LINEAR || KOR || align=right | 2.7 km || 
|-id=518 bgcolor=#E9E9E9
| 113518 ||  || — || October 1, 2002 || Socorro || LINEAR || — || align=right | 1.7 km || 
|-id=519 bgcolor=#E9E9E9
| 113519 ||  || — || October 1, 2002 || Haleakala || NEAT || — || align=right | 1.8 km || 
|-id=520 bgcolor=#fefefe
| 113520 ||  || — || October 2, 2002 || Socorro || LINEAR || — || align=right | 1.2 km || 
|-id=521 bgcolor=#d6d6d6
| 113521 ||  || — || October 2, 2002 || Socorro || LINEAR || — || align=right | 4.3 km || 
|-id=522 bgcolor=#fefefe
| 113522 ||  || — || October 2, 2002 || Socorro || LINEAR || — || align=right | 2.1 km || 
|-id=523 bgcolor=#fefefe
| 113523 ||  || — || October 2, 2002 || Socorro || LINEAR || V || align=right | 1.4 km || 
|-id=524 bgcolor=#d6d6d6
| 113524 ||  || — || October 2, 2002 || Socorro || LINEAR || EUP || align=right | 7.7 km || 
|-id=525 bgcolor=#d6d6d6
| 113525 ||  || — || October 2, 2002 || Socorro || LINEAR || — || align=right | 4.4 km || 
|-id=526 bgcolor=#E9E9E9
| 113526 ||  || — || October 2, 2002 || Socorro || LINEAR || PAD || align=right | 4.0 km || 
|-id=527 bgcolor=#fefefe
| 113527 ||  || — || October 2, 2002 || Socorro || LINEAR || MAS || align=right data-sort-value="0.86" | 860 m || 
|-id=528 bgcolor=#E9E9E9
| 113528 ||  || — || October 2, 2002 || Socorro || LINEAR || — || align=right | 3.5 km || 
|-id=529 bgcolor=#d6d6d6
| 113529 ||  || — || October 2, 2002 || Socorro || LINEAR || — || align=right | 3.2 km || 
|-id=530 bgcolor=#E9E9E9
| 113530 ||  || — || October 2, 2002 || Socorro || LINEAR || — || align=right | 3.2 km || 
|-id=531 bgcolor=#fefefe
| 113531 ||  || — || October 2, 2002 || Socorro || LINEAR || FLO || align=right | 1.0 km || 
|-id=532 bgcolor=#fefefe
| 113532 ||  || — || October 2, 2002 || Socorro || LINEAR || MAS || align=right | 1.3 km || 
|-id=533 bgcolor=#E9E9E9
| 113533 ||  || — || October 2, 2002 || Socorro || LINEAR || — || align=right | 4.4 km || 
|-id=534 bgcolor=#E9E9E9
| 113534 ||  || — || October 2, 2002 || Socorro || LINEAR || — || align=right | 4.1 km || 
|-id=535 bgcolor=#d6d6d6
| 113535 ||  || — || October 2, 2002 || Socorro || LINEAR || KOR || align=right | 2.4 km || 
|-id=536 bgcolor=#E9E9E9
| 113536 ||  || — || October 2, 2002 || Socorro || LINEAR || — || align=right | 2.9 km || 
|-id=537 bgcolor=#E9E9E9
| 113537 ||  || — || October 2, 2002 || Socorro || LINEAR || — || align=right | 4.2 km || 
|-id=538 bgcolor=#E9E9E9
| 113538 ||  || — || October 2, 2002 || Socorro || LINEAR || — || align=right | 4.6 km || 
|-id=539 bgcolor=#d6d6d6
| 113539 ||  || — || October 2, 2002 || Socorro || LINEAR || — || align=right | 6.1 km || 
|-id=540 bgcolor=#E9E9E9
| 113540 ||  || — || October 2, 2002 || Socorro || LINEAR || BRG || align=right | 2.8 km || 
|-id=541 bgcolor=#d6d6d6
| 113541 ||  || — || October 2, 2002 || Socorro || LINEAR || — || align=right | 4.9 km || 
|-id=542 bgcolor=#d6d6d6
| 113542 ||  || — || October 2, 2002 || Socorro || LINEAR || — || align=right | 7.8 km || 
|-id=543 bgcolor=#fefefe
| 113543 ||  || — || October 2, 2002 || Socorro || LINEAR || — || align=right | 1.5 km || 
|-id=544 bgcolor=#E9E9E9
| 113544 ||  || — || October 2, 2002 || Socorro || LINEAR || — || align=right | 5.5 km || 
|-id=545 bgcolor=#fefefe
| 113545 ||  || — || October 2, 2002 || Socorro || LINEAR || — || align=right | 1.4 km || 
|-id=546 bgcolor=#d6d6d6
| 113546 ||  || — || October 2, 2002 || Socorro || LINEAR || — || align=right | 4.5 km || 
|-id=547 bgcolor=#d6d6d6
| 113547 ||  || — || October 2, 2002 || Socorro || LINEAR || — || align=right | 4.8 km || 
|-id=548 bgcolor=#E9E9E9
| 113548 ||  || — || October 2, 2002 || Socorro || LINEAR || — || align=right | 4.0 km || 
|-id=549 bgcolor=#E9E9E9
| 113549 ||  || — || October 2, 2002 || Socorro || LINEAR || — || align=right | 4.3 km || 
|-id=550 bgcolor=#fefefe
| 113550 ||  || — || October 2, 2002 || Socorro || LINEAR || NYS || align=right | 1.0 km || 
|-id=551 bgcolor=#d6d6d6
| 113551 ||  || — || October 2, 2002 || Socorro || LINEAR || — || align=right | 4.5 km || 
|-id=552 bgcolor=#fefefe
| 113552 ||  || — || October 2, 2002 || Socorro || LINEAR || — || align=right | 1.2 km || 
|-id=553 bgcolor=#fefefe
| 113553 ||  || — || October 2, 2002 || Socorro || LINEAR || NYS || align=right | 1.2 km || 
|-id=554 bgcolor=#E9E9E9
| 113554 ||  || — || October 2, 2002 || Socorro || LINEAR || GEF || align=right | 3.3 km || 
|-id=555 bgcolor=#d6d6d6
| 113555 ||  || — || October 2, 2002 || Socorro || LINEAR || HYG || align=right | 6.9 km || 
|-id=556 bgcolor=#d6d6d6
| 113556 ||  || — || October 2, 2002 || Socorro || LINEAR || — || align=right | 6.0 km || 
|-id=557 bgcolor=#fefefe
| 113557 ||  || — || October 2, 2002 || Socorro || LINEAR || — || align=right | 1.4 km || 
|-id=558 bgcolor=#E9E9E9
| 113558 ||  || — || October 2, 2002 || Socorro || LINEAR || MAR || align=right | 3.0 km || 
|-id=559 bgcolor=#fefefe
| 113559 ||  || — || October 2, 2002 || Socorro || LINEAR || — || align=right | 1.3 km || 
|-id=560 bgcolor=#fefefe
| 113560 ||  || — || October 2, 2002 || Socorro || LINEAR || V || align=right | 1.5 km || 
|-id=561 bgcolor=#E9E9E9
| 113561 ||  || — || October 2, 2002 || Socorro || LINEAR || HEN || align=right | 2.0 km || 
|-id=562 bgcolor=#d6d6d6
| 113562 ||  || — || October 2, 2002 || Socorro || LINEAR || — || align=right | 5.4 km || 
|-id=563 bgcolor=#E9E9E9
| 113563 ||  || — || October 2, 2002 || Socorro || LINEAR || HEN || align=right | 3.6 km || 
|-id=564 bgcolor=#d6d6d6
| 113564 ||  || — || October 2, 2002 || Socorro || LINEAR || 628 || align=right | 5.0 km || 
|-id=565 bgcolor=#d6d6d6
| 113565 ||  || — || October 2, 2002 || Socorro || LINEAR || EOS || align=right | 4.2 km || 
|-id=566 bgcolor=#E9E9E9
| 113566 ||  || — || October 2, 2002 || Socorro || LINEAR || WIT || align=right | 2.4 km || 
|-id=567 bgcolor=#fefefe
| 113567 ||  || — || October 2, 2002 || Socorro || LINEAR || — || align=right | 2.0 km || 
|-id=568 bgcolor=#d6d6d6
| 113568 ||  || — || October 2, 2002 || Socorro || LINEAR || KOR || align=right | 3.1 km || 
|-id=569 bgcolor=#d6d6d6
| 113569 ||  || — || October 2, 2002 || Socorro || LINEAR || — || align=right | 5.5 km || 
|-id=570 bgcolor=#E9E9E9
| 113570 ||  || — || October 2, 2002 || Socorro || LINEAR || — || align=right | 1.5 km || 
|-id=571 bgcolor=#fefefe
| 113571 ||  || — || October 2, 2002 || Socorro || LINEAR || FLO || align=right | 1.1 km || 
|-id=572 bgcolor=#E9E9E9
| 113572 ||  || — || October 2, 2002 || Socorro || LINEAR || — || align=right | 5.1 km || 
|-id=573 bgcolor=#E9E9E9
| 113573 ||  || — || October 2, 2002 || Socorro || LINEAR || — || align=right | 2.2 km || 
|-id=574 bgcolor=#fefefe
| 113574 ||  || — || October 2, 2002 || Socorro || LINEAR || FLO || align=right | 1.8 km || 
|-id=575 bgcolor=#E9E9E9
| 113575 ||  || — || October 2, 2002 || Socorro || LINEAR || — || align=right | 3.2 km || 
|-id=576 bgcolor=#E9E9E9
| 113576 ||  || — || October 2, 2002 || Socorro || LINEAR || — || align=right | 5.1 km || 
|-id=577 bgcolor=#d6d6d6
| 113577 ||  || — || October 2, 2002 || Socorro || LINEAR || ALA || align=right | 10 km || 
|-id=578 bgcolor=#E9E9E9
| 113578 ||  || — || October 2, 2002 || Socorro || LINEAR || HEN || align=right | 2.1 km || 
|-id=579 bgcolor=#E9E9E9
| 113579 ||  || — || October 2, 2002 || Socorro || LINEAR || — || align=right | 1.6 km || 
|-id=580 bgcolor=#d6d6d6
| 113580 ||  || — || October 2, 2002 || Socorro || LINEAR || — || align=right | 4.5 km || 
|-id=581 bgcolor=#d6d6d6
| 113581 ||  || — || October 2, 2002 || Socorro || LINEAR || — || align=right | 6.2 km || 
|-id=582 bgcolor=#E9E9E9
| 113582 ||  || — || October 2, 2002 || Socorro || LINEAR || — || align=right | 3.7 km || 
|-id=583 bgcolor=#E9E9E9
| 113583 ||  || — || October 2, 2002 || Socorro || LINEAR || — || align=right | 4.5 km || 
|-id=584 bgcolor=#d6d6d6
| 113584 ||  || — || October 2, 2002 || Socorro || LINEAR || — || align=right | 7.9 km || 
|-id=585 bgcolor=#E9E9E9
| 113585 ||  || — || October 2, 2002 || Socorro || LINEAR || — || align=right | 4.9 km || 
|-id=586 bgcolor=#E9E9E9
| 113586 ||  || — || October 2, 2002 || Socorro || LINEAR || — || align=right | 4.8 km || 
|-id=587 bgcolor=#d6d6d6
| 113587 ||  || — || October 2, 2002 || Socorro || LINEAR || THM || align=right | 3.9 km || 
|-id=588 bgcolor=#d6d6d6
| 113588 ||  || — || October 2, 2002 || Socorro || LINEAR || EOS || align=right | 3.4 km || 
|-id=589 bgcolor=#fefefe
| 113589 ||  || — || October 2, 2002 || Socorro || LINEAR || — || align=right | 1.8 km || 
|-id=590 bgcolor=#E9E9E9
| 113590 ||  || — || October 2, 2002 || Socorro || LINEAR || — || align=right | 4.7 km || 
|-id=591 bgcolor=#fefefe
| 113591 ||  || — || October 2, 2002 || Socorro || LINEAR || — || align=right | 1.1 km || 
|-id=592 bgcolor=#E9E9E9
| 113592 ||  || — || October 2, 2002 || Socorro || LINEAR || — || align=right | 3.4 km || 
|-id=593 bgcolor=#E9E9E9
| 113593 ||  || — || October 2, 2002 || Socorro || LINEAR || MRX || align=right | 2.2 km || 
|-id=594 bgcolor=#d6d6d6
| 113594 ||  || — || October 2, 2002 || Socorro || LINEAR || — || align=right | 4.8 km || 
|-id=595 bgcolor=#E9E9E9
| 113595 ||  || — || October 2, 2002 || Socorro || LINEAR || EUN || align=right | 2.2 km || 
|-id=596 bgcolor=#fefefe
| 113596 ||  || — || October 2, 2002 || Socorro || LINEAR || — || align=right | 1.6 km || 
|-id=597 bgcolor=#E9E9E9
| 113597 ||  || — || October 2, 2002 || Socorro || LINEAR || — || align=right | 1.7 km || 
|-id=598 bgcolor=#d6d6d6
| 113598 ||  || — || October 2, 2002 || Socorro || LINEAR || — || align=right | 6.8 km || 
|-id=599 bgcolor=#E9E9E9
| 113599 ||  || — || October 2, 2002 || Socorro || LINEAR || — || align=right | 6.9 km || 
|-id=600 bgcolor=#fefefe
| 113600 ||  || — || October 2, 2002 || Socorro || LINEAR || FLO || align=right | 1.5 km || 
|}

113601–113700 

|-bgcolor=#d6d6d6
| 113601 ||  || — || October 2, 2002 || Socorro || LINEAR || — || align=right | 6.8 km || 
|-id=602 bgcolor=#fefefe
| 113602 ||  || — || October 2, 2002 || Socorro || LINEAR || — || align=right | 1.9 km || 
|-id=603 bgcolor=#E9E9E9
| 113603 ||  || — || October 2, 2002 || Socorro || LINEAR || — || align=right | 2.0 km || 
|-id=604 bgcolor=#fefefe
| 113604 ||  || — || October 2, 2002 || Socorro || LINEAR || FLO || align=right | 1.5 km || 
|-id=605 bgcolor=#fefefe
| 113605 ||  || — || October 2, 2002 || Socorro || LINEAR || V || align=right | 1.4 km || 
|-id=606 bgcolor=#fefefe
| 113606 ||  || — || October 2, 2002 || Socorro || LINEAR || FLO || align=right | 2.2 km || 
|-id=607 bgcolor=#d6d6d6
| 113607 ||  || — || October 2, 2002 || Socorro || LINEAR || — || align=right | 7.7 km || 
|-id=608 bgcolor=#fefefe
| 113608 ||  || — || October 2, 2002 || Socorro || LINEAR || V || align=right | 1.3 km || 
|-id=609 bgcolor=#fefefe
| 113609 ||  || — || October 2, 2002 || Socorro || LINEAR || — || align=right | 3.3 km || 
|-id=610 bgcolor=#fefefe
| 113610 ||  || — || October 2, 2002 || Socorro || LINEAR || — || align=right | 1.9 km || 
|-id=611 bgcolor=#fefefe
| 113611 ||  || — || October 2, 2002 || Socorro || LINEAR || — || align=right | 1.5 km || 
|-id=612 bgcolor=#d6d6d6
| 113612 ||  || — || October 2, 2002 || Socorro || LINEAR || KOR || align=right | 2.4 km || 
|-id=613 bgcolor=#E9E9E9
| 113613 ||  || — || October 2, 2002 || Haleakala || NEAT || — || align=right | 2.8 km || 
|-id=614 bgcolor=#d6d6d6
| 113614 ||  || — || October 2, 2002 || Haleakala || NEAT || — || align=right | 4.1 km || 
|-id=615 bgcolor=#fefefe
| 113615 ||  || — || October 3, 2002 || Socorro || LINEAR || PHO || align=right | 2.3 km || 
|-id=616 bgcolor=#fefefe
| 113616 ||  || — || October 2, 2002 || Socorro || LINEAR || NYS || align=right data-sort-value="0.90" | 900 m || 
|-id=617 bgcolor=#d6d6d6
| 113617 ||  || — || October 2, 2002 || Socorro || LINEAR || HYG || align=right | 4.2 km || 
|-id=618 bgcolor=#E9E9E9
| 113618 ||  || — || October 4, 2002 || Fountain Hills || C. W. Juels, P. R. Holvorcem || — || align=right | 5.4 km || 
|-id=619 bgcolor=#d6d6d6
| 113619 ||  || — || October 3, 2002 || Socorro || LINEAR || — || align=right | 5.5 km || 
|-id=620 bgcolor=#d6d6d6
| 113620 ||  || — || October 3, 2002 || Campo Imperatore || CINEOS || — || align=right | 4.7 km || 
|-id=621 bgcolor=#d6d6d6
| 113621 ||  || — || October 3, 2002 || Campo Imperatore || CINEOS || — || align=right | 5.4 km || 
|-id=622 bgcolor=#d6d6d6
| 113622 ||  || — || October 3, 2002 || Campo Imperatore || CINEOS || — || align=right | 4.6 km || 
|-id=623 bgcolor=#fefefe
| 113623 ||  || — || October 3, 2002 || Campo Imperatore || CINEOS || — || align=right | 1.2 km || 
|-id=624 bgcolor=#E9E9E9
| 113624 ||  || — || October 4, 2002 || Socorro || LINEAR || — || align=right | 2.9 km || 
|-id=625 bgcolor=#fefefe
| 113625 ||  || — || October 2, 2002 || Kvistaberg || UDAS || FLO || align=right | 1.3 km || 
|-id=626 bgcolor=#d6d6d6
| 113626 ||  || — || October 4, 2002 || Campo Imperatore || CINEOS || — || align=right | 5.0 km || 
|-id=627 bgcolor=#E9E9E9
| 113627 ||  || — || October 6, 2002 || Essen || Walter Hohmann Obs. || JUN || align=right | 2.5 km || 
|-id=628 bgcolor=#d6d6d6
| 113628 ||  || — || October 3, 2002 || Palomar || NEAT || FIR || align=right | 9.6 km || 
|-id=629 bgcolor=#E9E9E9
| 113629 ||  || — || October 3, 2002 || Palomar || NEAT || — || align=right | 3.7 km || 
|-id=630 bgcolor=#E9E9E9
| 113630 ||  || — || October 3, 2002 || Palomar || NEAT || — || align=right | 2.8 km || 
|-id=631 bgcolor=#d6d6d6
| 113631 ||  || — || October 3, 2002 || Palomar || NEAT || EOS || align=right | 4.1 km || 
|-id=632 bgcolor=#fefefe
| 113632 ||  || — || October 3, 2002 || Palomar || NEAT || — || align=right | 3.7 km || 
|-id=633 bgcolor=#d6d6d6
| 113633 ||  || — || October 3, 2002 || Palomar || NEAT || EOS || align=right | 4.1 km || 
|-id=634 bgcolor=#d6d6d6
| 113634 ||  || — || October 3, 2002 || Palomar || NEAT || EOS || align=right | 3.9 km || 
|-id=635 bgcolor=#d6d6d6
| 113635 ||  || — || October 3, 2002 || Palomar || NEAT || — || align=right | 5.7 km || 
|-id=636 bgcolor=#E9E9E9
| 113636 ||  || — || October 1, 2002 || Anderson Mesa || LONEOS || PAD || align=right | 4.9 km || 
|-id=637 bgcolor=#fefefe
| 113637 ||  || — || October 1, 2002 || Anderson Mesa || LONEOS || — || align=right | 1.8 km || 
|-id=638 bgcolor=#E9E9E9
| 113638 ||  || — || October 1, 2002 || Anderson Mesa || LONEOS || — || align=right | 1.8 km || 
|-id=639 bgcolor=#fefefe
| 113639 ||  || — || October 1, 2002 || Anderson Mesa || LONEOS || — || align=right | 1.2 km || 
|-id=640 bgcolor=#E9E9E9
| 113640 ||  || — || October 1, 2002 || Anderson Mesa || LONEOS || AGN || align=right | 2.6 km || 
|-id=641 bgcolor=#d6d6d6
| 113641 ||  || — || October 1, 2002 || Anderson Mesa || LONEOS || — || align=right | 5.0 km || 
|-id=642 bgcolor=#d6d6d6
| 113642 ||  || — || October 1, 2002 || Anderson Mesa || LONEOS || — || align=right | 4.7 km || 
|-id=643 bgcolor=#E9E9E9
| 113643 ||  || — || October 1, 2002 || Anderson Mesa || LONEOS || — || align=right | 4.4 km || 
|-id=644 bgcolor=#E9E9E9
| 113644 ||  || — || October 1, 2002 || Anderson Mesa || LONEOS || RAF || align=right | 2.8 km || 
|-id=645 bgcolor=#E9E9E9
| 113645 ||  || — || October 1, 2002 || Socorro || LINEAR || — || align=right | 4.5 km || 
|-id=646 bgcolor=#E9E9E9
| 113646 ||  || — || October 1, 2002 || Haleakala || NEAT || INO || align=right | 2.0 km || 
|-id=647 bgcolor=#fefefe
| 113647 ||  || — || October 1, 2002 || Haleakala || NEAT || — || align=right | 1.7 km || 
|-id=648 bgcolor=#E9E9E9
| 113648 ||  || — || October 1, 2002 || Socorro || LINEAR || — || align=right | 5.6 km || 
|-id=649 bgcolor=#d6d6d6
| 113649 ||  || — || October 1, 2002 || Socorro || LINEAR || — || align=right | 5.2 km || 
|-id=650 bgcolor=#fefefe
| 113650 ||  || — || October 1, 2002 || Socorro || LINEAR || V || align=right | 1.9 km || 
|-id=651 bgcolor=#E9E9E9
| 113651 ||  || — || October 1, 2002 || Socorro || LINEAR || — || align=right | 1.8 km || 
|-id=652 bgcolor=#E9E9E9
| 113652 ||  || — || October 1, 2002 || Socorro || LINEAR || — || align=right | 4.7 km || 
|-id=653 bgcolor=#fefefe
| 113653 ||  || — || October 1, 2002 || Haleakala || NEAT || V || align=right | 1.2 km || 
|-id=654 bgcolor=#fefefe
| 113654 ||  || — || October 2, 2002 || Socorro || LINEAR || — || align=right | 1.8 km || 
|-id=655 bgcolor=#d6d6d6
| 113655 ||  || — || October 2, 2002 || Haleakala || NEAT || HYG || align=right | 6.7 km || 
|-id=656 bgcolor=#d6d6d6
| 113656 ||  || — || October 2, 2002 || Haleakala || NEAT || — || align=right | 6.4 km || 
|-id=657 bgcolor=#E9E9E9
| 113657 ||  || — || October 2, 2002 || Haleakala || NEAT || — || align=right | 3.3 km || 
|-id=658 bgcolor=#fefefe
| 113658 ||  || — || October 2, 2002 || Haleakala || NEAT || — || align=right | 2.2 km || 
|-id=659 bgcolor=#d6d6d6
| 113659 Faltona ||  ||  || October 2, 2002 || Campo Imperatore || E. Palomba || EOS || align=right | 5.1 km || 
|-id=660 bgcolor=#d6d6d6
| 113660 ||  || — || October 2, 2002 || Campo Imperatore || CINEOS || URS || align=right | 5.7 km || 
|-id=661 bgcolor=#d6d6d6
| 113661 ||  || — || October 2, 2002 || Campo Imperatore || CINEOS || — || align=right | 6.7 km || 
|-id=662 bgcolor=#d6d6d6
| 113662 ||  || — || October 3, 2002 || Socorro || LINEAR || — || align=right | 3.9 km || 
|-id=663 bgcolor=#fefefe
| 113663 ||  || — || October 3, 2002 || Socorro || LINEAR || V || align=right | 1.4 km || 
|-id=664 bgcolor=#fefefe
| 113664 ||  || — || October 3, 2002 || Palomar || NEAT || — || align=right | 1.6 km || 
|-id=665 bgcolor=#fefefe
| 113665 ||  || — || October 3, 2002 || Palomar || NEAT || FLO || align=right | 1.3 km || 
|-id=666 bgcolor=#d6d6d6
| 113666 ||  || — || October 3, 2002 || Palomar || NEAT || — || align=right | 8.2 km || 
|-id=667 bgcolor=#d6d6d6
| 113667 ||  || — || October 3, 2002 || Palomar || NEAT || 7:4 || align=right | 7.9 km || 
|-id=668 bgcolor=#fefefe
| 113668 ||  || — || October 3, 2002 || Palomar || NEAT || FLO || align=right | 1.2 km || 
|-id=669 bgcolor=#d6d6d6
| 113669 ||  || — || October 3, 2002 || Palomar || NEAT || — || align=right | 4.3 km || 
|-id=670 bgcolor=#fefefe
| 113670 ||  || — || October 3, 2002 || Palomar || NEAT || CIM || align=right | 4.6 km || 
|-id=671 bgcolor=#d6d6d6
| 113671 Sacromonte ||  ||  || October 13, 2002 || Schiaparelli || L. Buzzi || — || align=right | 6.4 km || 
|-id=672 bgcolor=#fefefe
| 113672 ||  || — || October 10, 2002 || Farpoint || Farpoint Obs. || — || align=right | 2.1 km || 
|-id=673 bgcolor=#d6d6d6
| 113673 ||  || — || October 2, 2002 || Campo Imperatore || CINEOS || — || align=right | 6.2 km || 
|-id=674 bgcolor=#E9E9E9
| 113674 ||  || — || October 4, 2002 || Socorro || LINEAR || RAF || align=right | 2.0 km || 
|-id=675 bgcolor=#E9E9E9
| 113675 ||  || — || October 4, 2002 || Socorro || LINEAR || — || align=right | 5.2 km || 
|-id=676 bgcolor=#E9E9E9
| 113676 ||  || — || October 4, 2002 || Socorro || LINEAR || — || align=right | 2.5 km || 
|-id=677 bgcolor=#d6d6d6
| 113677 ||  || — || October 4, 2002 || Anderson Mesa || LONEOS || — || align=right | 5.8 km || 
|-id=678 bgcolor=#E9E9E9
| 113678 ||  || — || October 2, 2002 || Socorro || LINEAR || — || align=right | 5.2 km || 
|-id=679 bgcolor=#E9E9E9
| 113679 ||  || — || October 1, 2002 || Anderson Mesa || LONEOS || — || align=right | 4.6 km || 
|-id=680 bgcolor=#E9E9E9
| 113680 ||  || — || October 1, 2002 || Haleakala || NEAT || — || align=right | 3.6 km || 
|-id=681 bgcolor=#FA8072
| 113681 ||  || — || October 2, 2002 || Haleakala || NEAT || — || align=right | 1.5 km || 
|-id=682 bgcolor=#d6d6d6
| 113682 ||  || — || October 2, 2002 || Haleakala || NEAT || — || align=right | 7.2 km || 
|-id=683 bgcolor=#d6d6d6
| 113683 ||  || — || October 2, 2002 || Campo Imperatore || CINEOS || EOS || align=right | 4.3 km || 
|-id=684 bgcolor=#d6d6d6
| 113684 ||  || — || October 2, 2002 || Campo Imperatore || CINEOS || — || align=right | 6.9 km || 
|-id=685 bgcolor=#d6d6d6
| 113685 ||  || — || October 3, 2002 || Socorro || LINEAR || KOR || align=right | 3.2 km || 
|-id=686 bgcolor=#E9E9E9
| 113686 ||  || — || October 3, 2002 || Socorro || LINEAR || — || align=right | 4.4 km || 
|-id=687 bgcolor=#d6d6d6
| 113687 ||  || — || October 3, 2002 || Palomar || NEAT || — || align=right | 8.7 km || 
|-id=688 bgcolor=#E9E9E9
| 113688 ||  || — || October 3, 2002 || Palomar || NEAT || — || align=right | 2.2 km || 
|-id=689 bgcolor=#d6d6d6
| 113689 ||  || — || October 3, 2002 || Palomar || NEAT || — || align=right | 6.1 km || 
|-id=690 bgcolor=#E9E9E9
| 113690 ||  || — || October 3, 2002 || Palomar || NEAT || — || align=right | 3.5 km || 
|-id=691 bgcolor=#E9E9E9
| 113691 ||  || — || October 3, 2002 || Palomar || NEAT || — || align=right | 2.8 km || 
|-id=692 bgcolor=#fefefe
| 113692 ||  || — || October 3, 2002 || Palomar || NEAT || — || align=right | 2.2 km || 
|-id=693 bgcolor=#E9E9E9
| 113693 ||  || — || October 3, 2002 || Palomar || NEAT || — || align=right | 5.0 km || 
|-id=694 bgcolor=#E9E9E9
| 113694 ||  || — || October 3, 2002 || Palomar || NEAT || — || align=right | 4.7 km || 
|-id=695 bgcolor=#fefefe
| 113695 ||  || — || October 3, 2002 || Palomar || NEAT || — || align=right | 1.5 km || 
|-id=696 bgcolor=#d6d6d6
| 113696 ||  || — || October 3, 2002 || Palomar || NEAT || EOS || align=right | 5.2 km || 
|-id=697 bgcolor=#fefefe
| 113697 ||  || — || October 3, 2002 || Palomar || NEAT || — || align=right | 1.6 km || 
|-id=698 bgcolor=#d6d6d6
| 113698 ||  || — || October 4, 2002 || Palomar || NEAT || — || align=right | 6.6 km || 
|-id=699 bgcolor=#fefefe
| 113699 ||  || — || October 4, 2002 || Palomar || NEAT || — || align=right | 1.4 km || 
|-id=700 bgcolor=#d6d6d6
| 113700 ||  || — || October 4, 2002 || Palomar || NEAT || — || align=right | 4.1 km || 
|}

113701–113800 

|-bgcolor=#d6d6d6
| 113701 ||  || — || October 4, 2002 || Socorro || LINEAR || — || align=right | 5.5 km || 
|-id=702 bgcolor=#d6d6d6
| 113702 ||  || — || October 4, 2002 || Socorro || LINEAR || — || align=right | 6.7 km || 
|-id=703 bgcolor=#fefefe
| 113703 ||  || — || October 4, 2002 || Socorro || LINEAR || — || align=right | 1.3 km || 
|-id=704 bgcolor=#d6d6d6
| 113704 ||  || — || October 4, 2002 || Palomar || NEAT || — || align=right | 4.7 km || 
|-id=705 bgcolor=#d6d6d6
| 113705 ||  || — || October 4, 2002 || Socorro || LINEAR || — || align=right | 5.4 km || 
|-id=706 bgcolor=#d6d6d6
| 113706 ||  || — || October 4, 2002 || Palomar || NEAT || — || align=right | 3.9 km || 
|-id=707 bgcolor=#d6d6d6
| 113707 ||  || — || October 4, 2002 || Palomar || NEAT || VER || align=right | 6.5 km || 
|-id=708 bgcolor=#d6d6d6
| 113708 ||  || — || October 4, 2002 || Socorro || LINEAR || — || align=right | 4.2 km || 
|-id=709 bgcolor=#fefefe
| 113709 ||  || — || October 4, 2002 || Socorro || LINEAR || — || align=right | 3.2 km || 
|-id=710 bgcolor=#E9E9E9
| 113710 ||  || — || October 4, 2002 || Socorro || LINEAR || DOR || align=right | 5.9 km || 
|-id=711 bgcolor=#fefefe
| 113711 ||  || — || October 4, 2002 || Socorro || LINEAR || — || align=right | 1.6 km || 
|-id=712 bgcolor=#d6d6d6
| 113712 ||  || — || October 4, 2002 || Socorro || LINEAR || — || align=right | 7.2 km || 
|-id=713 bgcolor=#d6d6d6
| 113713 ||  || — || October 4, 2002 || Socorro || LINEAR || VER || align=right | 8.6 km || 
|-id=714 bgcolor=#d6d6d6
| 113714 ||  || — || October 4, 2002 || Socorro || LINEAR || HYG || align=right | 5.9 km || 
|-id=715 bgcolor=#d6d6d6
| 113715 ||  || — || October 4, 2002 || Anderson Mesa || LONEOS || — || align=right | 6.5 km || 
|-id=716 bgcolor=#d6d6d6
| 113716 ||  || — || October 4, 2002 || Palomar || NEAT || EOS || align=right | 4.4 km || 
|-id=717 bgcolor=#fefefe
| 113717 ||  || — || October 4, 2002 || Palomar || NEAT || — || align=right | 1.6 km || 
|-id=718 bgcolor=#d6d6d6
| 113718 ||  || — || October 4, 2002 || Anderson Mesa || LONEOS || — || align=right | 6.3 km || 
|-id=719 bgcolor=#E9E9E9
| 113719 ||  || — || October 4, 2002 || Anderson Mesa || LONEOS || BRG || align=right | 3.5 km || 
|-id=720 bgcolor=#d6d6d6
| 113720 ||  || — || October 4, 2002 || Palomar || NEAT || — || align=right | 4.6 km || 
|-id=721 bgcolor=#d6d6d6
| 113721 ||  || — || October 4, 2002 || Anderson Mesa || LONEOS || EOS || align=right | 4.0 km || 
|-id=722 bgcolor=#fefefe
| 113722 ||  || — || October 4, 2002 || Anderson Mesa || LONEOS || — || align=right | 1.6 km || 
|-id=723 bgcolor=#d6d6d6
| 113723 ||  || — || October 4, 2002 || Anderson Mesa || LONEOS || — || align=right | 5.1 km || 
|-id=724 bgcolor=#d6d6d6
| 113724 ||  || — || October 4, 2002 || Anderson Mesa || LONEOS || — || align=right | 9.8 km || 
|-id=725 bgcolor=#fefefe
| 113725 ||  || — || October 4, 2002 || Anderson Mesa || LONEOS || — || align=right | 1.7 km || 
|-id=726 bgcolor=#E9E9E9
| 113726 ||  || — || October 5, 2002 || Palomar || NEAT || — || align=right | 2.2 km || 
|-id=727 bgcolor=#fefefe
| 113727 ||  || — || October 4, 2002 || Socorro || LINEAR || — || align=right | 2.4 km || 
|-id=728 bgcolor=#fefefe
| 113728 ||  || — || October 4, 2002 || Socorro || LINEAR || — || align=right | 2.1 km || 
|-id=729 bgcolor=#fefefe
| 113729 ||  || — || October 4, 2002 || Socorro || LINEAR || — || align=right | 2.0 km || 
|-id=730 bgcolor=#E9E9E9
| 113730 ||  || — || October 4, 2002 || Socorro || LINEAR || — || align=right | 3.0 km || 
|-id=731 bgcolor=#E9E9E9
| 113731 ||  || — || October 4, 2002 || Socorro || LINEAR || — || align=right | 4.9 km || 
|-id=732 bgcolor=#E9E9E9
| 113732 ||  || — || October 4, 2002 || Socorro || LINEAR || — || align=right | 2.4 km || 
|-id=733 bgcolor=#d6d6d6
| 113733 ||  || — || October 2, 2002 || Socorro || LINEAR || KOR || align=right | 2.2 km || 
|-id=734 bgcolor=#fefefe
| 113734 ||  || — || October 5, 2002 || Palomar || NEAT || — || align=right | 1.1 km || 
|-id=735 bgcolor=#d6d6d6
| 113735 ||  || — || October 5, 2002 || Socorro || LINEAR || — || align=right | 6.0 km || 
|-id=736 bgcolor=#d6d6d6
| 113736 ||  || — || October 5, 2002 || Socorro || LINEAR || — || align=right | 4.1 km || 
|-id=737 bgcolor=#E9E9E9
| 113737 ||  || — || October 5, 2002 || Palomar || NEAT || — || align=right | 2.7 km || 
|-id=738 bgcolor=#E9E9E9
| 113738 ||  || — || October 5, 2002 || Palomar || NEAT || — || align=right | 2.4 km || 
|-id=739 bgcolor=#E9E9E9
| 113739 ||  || — || October 5, 2002 || Socorro || LINEAR || — || align=right | 2.3 km || 
|-id=740 bgcolor=#E9E9E9
| 113740 ||  || — || October 5, 2002 || Palomar || NEAT || — || align=right | 4.5 km || 
|-id=741 bgcolor=#d6d6d6
| 113741 ||  || — || October 5, 2002 || Palomar || NEAT || — || align=right | 4.5 km || 
|-id=742 bgcolor=#E9E9E9
| 113742 ||  || — || October 5, 2002 || Palomar || NEAT || — || align=right | 2.8 km || 
|-id=743 bgcolor=#E9E9E9
| 113743 ||  || — || October 5, 2002 || Palomar || NEAT || — || align=right | 1.7 km || 
|-id=744 bgcolor=#d6d6d6
| 113744 ||  || — || October 5, 2002 || Palomar || NEAT || URS || align=right | 7.3 km || 
|-id=745 bgcolor=#E9E9E9
| 113745 ||  || — || October 5, 2002 || Palomar || NEAT || — || align=right | 2.5 km || 
|-id=746 bgcolor=#E9E9E9
| 113746 ||  || — || October 5, 2002 || Palomar || NEAT || — || align=right | 3.4 km || 
|-id=747 bgcolor=#d6d6d6
| 113747 ||  || — || October 5, 2002 || Palomar || NEAT || TIR || align=right | 7.5 km || 
|-id=748 bgcolor=#d6d6d6
| 113748 ||  || — || October 5, 2002 || Palomar || NEAT || 7:4 || align=right | 8.2 km || 
|-id=749 bgcolor=#d6d6d6
| 113749 ||  || — || October 3, 2002 || Palomar || NEAT || — || align=right | 6.6 km || 
|-id=750 bgcolor=#E9E9E9
| 113750 ||  || — || October 3, 2002 || Socorro || LINEAR || — || align=right | 3.6 km || 
|-id=751 bgcolor=#d6d6d6
| 113751 ||  || — || October 3, 2002 || Palomar || NEAT || ALA || align=right | 8.0 km || 
|-id=752 bgcolor=#E9E9E9
| 113752 ||  || — || October 3, 2002 || Palomar || NEAT || — || align=right | 3.1 km || 
|-id=753 bgcolor=#d6d6d6
| 113753 ||  || — || October 3, 2002 || Palomar || NEAT || — || align=right | 5.0 km || 
|-id=754 bgcolor=#E9E9E9
| 113754 ||  || — || October 3, 2002 || Socorro || LINEAR || — || align=right | 3.5 km || 
|-id=755 bgcolor=#d6d6d6
| 113755 ||  || — || October 3, 2002 || Socorro || LINEAR || — || align=right | 5.4 km || 
|-id=756 bgcolor=#E9E9E9
| 113756 ||  || — || October 3, 2002 || Socorro || LINEAR || EUN || align=right | 3.4 km || 
|-id=757 bgcolor=#E9E9E9
| 113757 ||  || — || October 3, 2002 || Palomar || NEAT || — || align=right | 4.1 km || 
|-id=758 bgcolor=#fefefe
| 113758 ||  || — || October 3, 2002 || Palomar || NEAT || — || align=right | 1.8 km || 
|-id=759 bgcolor=#d6d6d6
| 113759 ||  || — || October 4, 2002 || Palomar || NEAT || URS || align=right | 8.2 km || 
|-id=760 bgcolor=#d6d6d6
| 113760 ||  || — || October 4, 2002 || Anderson Mesa || LONEOS || — || align=right | 5.4 km || 
|-id=761 bgcolor=#d6d6d6
| 113761 ||  || — || October 4, 2002 || Socorro || LINEAR || — || align=right | 6.0 km || 
|-id=762 bgcolor=#E9E9E9
| 113762 ||  || — || October 4, 2002 || Anderson Mesa || LONEOS || MAR || align=right | 2.4 km || 
|-id=763 bgcolor=#d6d6d6
| 113763 ||  || — || October 4, 2002 || Anderson Mesa || LONEOS || URS || align=right | 7.4 km || 
|-id=764 bgcolor=#fefefe
| 113764 ||  || — || October 4, 2002 || Anderson Mesa || LONEOS || — || align=right | 1.9 km || 
|-id=765 bgcolor=#d6d6d6
| 113765 ||  || — || October 4, 2002 || Socorro || LINEAR || EOS || align=right | 3.9 km || 
|-id=766 bgcolor=#d6d6d6
| 113766 ||  || — || October 4, 2002 || Socorro || LINEAR || EOS || align=right | 4.7 km || 
|-id=767 bgcolor=#d6d6d6
| 113767 ||  || — || October 4, 2002 || Socorro || LINEAR || — || align=right | 6.6 km || 
|-id=768 bgcolor=#E9E9E9
| 113768 ||  || — || October 5, 2002 || Palomar || NEAT || — || align=right | 4.0 km || 
|-id=769 bgcolor=#E9E9E9
| 113769 ||  || — || October 11, 2002 || Palomar || NEAT || — || align=right | 2.9 km || 
|-id=770 bgcolor=#E9E9E9
| 113770 ||  || — || October 13, 2002 || Palomar || NEAT || PAL || align=right | 6.3 km || 
|-id=771 bgcolor=#E9E9E9
| 113771 ||  || — || October 3, 2002 || Socorro || LINEAR || — || align=right | 1.8 km || 
|-id=772 bgcolor=#d6d6d6
| 113772 ||  || — || October 4, 2002 || Socorro || LINEAR || EOS || align=right | 4.6 km || 
|-id=773 bgcolor=#d6d6d6
| 113773 ||  || — || October 4, 2002 || Socorro || LINEAR || — || align=right | 5.6 km || 
|-id=774 bgcolor=#E9E9E9
| 113774 ||  || — || October 4, 2002 || Socorro || LINEAR || — || align=right | 1.9 km || 
|-id=775 bgcolor=#d6d6d6
| 113775 ||  || — || October 4, 2002 || Socorro || LINEAR || EOS || align=right | 3.9 km || 
|-id=776 bgcolor=#E9E9E9
| 113776 ||  || — || October 4, 2002 || Socorro || LINEAR || PAD || align=right | 4.2 km || 
|-id=777 bgcolor=#fefefe
| 113777 ||  || — || October 4, 2002 || Socorro || LINEAR || — || align=right | 1.3 km || 
|-id=778 bgcolor=#fefefe
| 113778 ||  || — || October 4, 2002 || Socorro || LINEAR || FLO || align=right data-sort-value="0.90" | 900 m || 
|-id=779 bgcolor=#E9E9E9
| 113779 ||  || — || October 4, 2002 || Socorro || LINEAR || — || align=right | 5.3 km || 
|-id=780 bgcolor=#fefefe
| 113780 ||  || — || October 4, 2002 || Socorro || LINEAR || FLO || align=right data-sort-value="0.96" | 960 m || 
|-id=781 bgcolor=#d6d6d6
| 113781 ||  || — || October 4, 2002 || Palomar || NEAT || — || align=right | 5.8 km || 
|-id=782 bgcolor=#d6d6d6
| 113782 ||  || — || October 4, 2002 || Socorro || LINEAR || — || align=right | 6.6 km || 
|-id=783 bgcolor=#d6d6d6
| 113783 ||  || — || October 1, 2002 || Socorro || LINEAR || URS || align=right | 8.4 km || 
|-id=784 bgcolor=#d6d6d6
| 113784 ||  || — || October 5, 2002 || Anderson Mesa || LONEOS || URS || align=right | 6.6 km || 
|-id=785 bgcolor=#d6d6d6
| 113785 ||  || — || October 5, 2002 || Anderson Mesa || LONEOS || — || align=right | 9.3 km || 
|-id=786 bgcolor=#d6d6d6
| 113786 ||  || — || October 3, 2002 || Socorro || LINEAR || — || align=right | 4.8 km || 
|-id=787 bgcolor=#E9E9E9
| 113787 ||  || — || October 3, 2002 || Socorro || LINEAR || — || align=right | 4.1 km || 
|-id=788 bgcolor=#fefefe
| 113788 ||  || — || October 3, 2002 || Socorro || LINEAR || — || align=right | 1.6 km || 
|-id=789 bgcolor=#d6d6d6
| 113789 ||  || — || October 3, 2002 || Socorro || LINEAR || KOR || align=right | 2.3 km || 
|-id=790 bgcolor=#d6d6d6
| 113790 ||  || — || October 3, 2002 || Socorro || LINEAR || — || align=right | 5.1 km || 
|-id=791 bgcolor=#E9E9E9
| 113791 ||  || — || October 3, 2002 || Socorro || LINEAR || WIT || align=right | 2.1 km || 
|-id=792 bgcolor=#E9E9E9
| 113792 ||  || — || October 3, 2002 || Socorro || LINEAR || — || align=right | 3.5 km || 
|-id=793 bgcolor=#E9E9E9
| 113793 ||  || — || October 4, 2002 || Socorro || LINEAR || — || align=right | 3.6 km || 
|-id=794 bgcolor=#d6d6d6
| 113794 ||  || — || October 4, 2002 || Socorro || LINEAR || — || align=right | 7.2 km || 
|-id=795 bgcolor=#d6d6d6
| 113795 ||  || — || October 4, 2002 || Socorro || LINEAR || HYG || align=right | 6.6 km || 
|-id=796 bgcolor=#E9E9E9
| 113796 ||  || — || October 5, 2002 || Socorro || LINEAR || — || align=right | 3.3 km || 
|-id=797 bgcolor=#d6d6d6
| 113797 ||  || — || October 6, 2002 || Anderson Mesa || LONEOS || ALA || align=right | 9.0 km || 
|-id=798 bgcolor=#E9E9E9
| 113798 ||  || — || October 4, 2002 || Socorro || LINEAR || — || align=right | 4.8 km || 
|-id=799 bgcolor=#fefefe
| 113799 ||  || — || October 4, 2002 || Socorro || LINEAR || — || align=right | 1.5 km || 
|-id=800 bgcolor=#fefefe
| 113800 ||  || — || October 4, 2002 || Socorro || LINEAR || — || align=right | 1.7 km || 
|}

113801–113900 

|-bgcolor=#fefefe
| 113801 ||  || — || October 4, 2002 || Socorro || LINEAR || — || align=right | 1.8 km || 
|-id=802 bgcolor=#d6d6d6
| 113802 ||  || — || October 4, 2002 || Socorro || LINEAR || EOS || align=right | 4.6 km || 
|-id=803 bgcolor=#fefefe
| 113803 ||  || — || October 4, 2002 || Socorro || LINEAR || — || align=right | 1.6 km || 
|-id=804 bgcolor=#E9E9E9
| 113804 ||  || — || October 4, 2002 || Socorro || LINEAR || ADE || align=right | 6.8 km || 
|-id=805 bgcolor=#fefefe
| 113805 ||  || — || October 4, 2002 || Socorro || LINEAR || V || align=right | 1.1 km || 
|-id=806 bgcolor=#E9E9E9
| 113806 ||  || — || October 4, 2002 || Socorro || LINEAR || — || align=right | 3.6 km || 
|-id=807 bgcolor=#d6d6d6
| 113807 ||  || — || October 6, 2002 || Socorro || LINEAR || — || align=right | 7.0 km || 
|-id=808 bgcolor=#d6d6d6
| 113808 ||  || — || October 6, 2002 || Socorro || LINEAR || EOS || align=right | 5.7 km || 
|-id=809 bgcolor=#d6d6d6
| 113809 ||  || — || October 7, 2002 || Socorro || LINEAR || HYG || align=right | 5.4 km || 
|-id=810 bgcolor=#E9E9E9
| 113810 ||  || — || October 7, 2002 || Socorro || LINEAR || GEF || align=right | 2.8 km || 
|-id=811 bgcolor=#fefefe
| 113811 ||  || — || October 7, 2002 || Socorro || LINEAR || NYS || align=right | 1.2 km || 
|-id=812 bgcolor=#E9E9E9
| 113812 ||  || — || October 5, 2002 || Socorro || LINEAR || — || align=right | 3.4 km || 
|-id=813 bgcolor=#d6d6d6
| 113813 ||  || — || October 7, 2002 || Haleakala || NEAT || TIR || align=right | 3.9 km || 
|-id=814 bgcolor=#E9E9E9
| 113814 ||  || — || October 3, 2002 || Socorro || LINEAR || — || align=right | 2.2 km || 
|-id=815 bgcolor=#fefefe
| 113815 ||  || — || October 4, 2002 || Socorro || LINEAR || V || align=right data-sort-value="0.88" | 880 m || 
|-id=816 bgcolor=#d6d6d6
| 113816 ||  || — || October 6, 2002 || Socorro || LINEAR || EOS || align=right | 4.4 km || 
|-id=817 bgcolor=#d6d6d6
| 113817 ||  || — || October 6, 2002 || Palomar || NEAT || MEL || align=right | 8.8 km || 
|-id=818 bgcolor=#E9E9E9
| 113818 ||  || — || October 6, 2002 || Palomar || NEAT || — || align=right | 5.0 km || 
|-id=819 bgcolor=#d6d6d6
| 113819 ||  || — || October 8, 2002 || Anderson Mesa || LONEOS || EOS || align=right | 3.8 km || 
|-id=820 bgcolor=#d6d6d6
| 113820 ||  || — || October 5, 2002 || Socorro || LINEAR || — || align=right | 4.4 km || 
|-id=821 bgcolor=#E9E9E9
| 113821 ||  || — || October 6, 2002 || Palomar || NEAT || — || align=right | 2.2 km || 
|-id=822 bgcolor=#d6d6d6
| 113822 ||  || — || October 6, 2002 || Haleakala || NEAT || EOS || align=right | 3.9 km || 
|-id=823 bgcolor=#d6d6d6
| 113823 ||  || — || October 7, 2002 || Anderson Mesa || LONEOS || — || align=right | 5.8 km || 
|-id=824 bgcolor=#E9E9E9
| 113824 ||  || — || October 7, 2002 || Socorro || LINEAR || WIT || align=right | 1.7 km || 
|-id=825 bgcolor=#d6d6d6
| 113825 ||  || — || October 7, 2002 || Socorro || LINEAR || — || align=right | 6.3 km || 
|-id=826 bgcolor=#d6d6d6
| 113826 ||  || — || October 7, 2002 || Socorro || LINEAR || — || align=right | 6.4 km || 
|-id=827 bgcolor=#d6d6d6
| 113827 ||  || — || October 8, 2002 || Anderson Mesa || LONEOS || — || align=right | 6.0 km || 
|-id=828 bgcolor=#E9E9E9
| 113828 ||  || — || October 8, 2002 || Anderson Mesa || LONEOS || DOR || align=right | 5.1 km || 
|-id=829 bgcolor=#d6d6d6
| 113829 ||  || — || October 8, 2002 || Anderson Mesa || LONEOS || — || align=right | 6.7 km || 
|-id=830 bgcolor=#fefefe
| 113830 ||  || — || October 8, 2002 || Anderson Mesa || LONEOS || — || align=right | 1.5 km || 
|-id=831 bgcolor=#d6d6d6
| 113831 ||  || — || October 8, 2002 || Anderson Mesa || LONEOS || — || align=right | 4.4 km || 
|-id=832 bgcolor=#E9E9E9
| 113832 ||  || — || October 8, 2002 || Anderson Mesa || LONEOS || — || align=right | 4.8 km || 
|-id=833 bgcolor=#d6d6d6
| 113833 ||  || — || October 7, 2002 || Haleakala || NEAT || 628 || align=right | 4.0 km || 
|-id=834 bgcolor=#E9E9E9
| 113834 ||  || — || October 8, 2002 || Palomar || NEAT || — || align=right | 6.6 km || 
|-id=835 bgcolor=#d6d6d6
| 113835 ||  || — || October 8, 2002 || Palomar || NEAT || — || align=right | 8.1 km || 
|-id=836 bgcolor=#d6d6d6
| 113836 ||  || — || October 8, 2002 || Palomar || NEAT || — || align=right | 7.2 km || 
|-id=837 bgcolor=#E9E9E9
| 113837 ||  || — || October 6, 2002 || Socorro || LINEAR || EUN || align=right | 2.6 km || 
|-id=838 bgcolor=#E9E9E9
| 113838 ||  || — || October 6, 2002 || Socorro || LINEAR || — || align=right | 2.6 km || 
|-id=839 bgcolor=#d6d6d6
| 113839 ||  || — || October 6, 2002 || Socorro || LINEAR || — || align=right | 6.1 km || 
|-id=840 bgcolor=#E9E9E9
| 113840 ||  || — || October 6, 2002 || Socorro || LINEAR || — || align=right | 4.2 km || 
|-id=841 bgcolor=#E9E9E9
| 113841 ||  || — || October 6, 2002 || Socorro || LINEAR || — || align=right | 5.0 km || 
|-id=842 bgcolor=#d6d6d6
| 113842 ||  || — || October 6, 2002 || Socorro || LINEAR || ALA || align=right | 8.2 km || 
|-id=843 bgcolor=#fefefe
| 113843 ||  || — || October 6, 2002 || Socorro || LINEAR || — || align=right | 1.7 km || 
|-id=844 bgcolor=#E9E9E9
| 113844 ||  || — || October 6, 2002 || Anderson Mesa || LONEOS || — || align=right | 2.3 km || 
|-id=845 bgcolor=#E9E9E9
| 113845 ||  || — || October 7, 2002 || Socorro || LINEAR || — || align=right | 3.5 km || 
|-id=846 bgcolor=#fefefe
| 113846 ||  || — || October 9, 2002 || Socorro || LINEAR || fast? || align=right | 2.8 km || 
|-id=847 bgcolor=#d6d6d6
| 113847 ||  || — || October 6, 2002 || Palomar || NEAT || — || align=right | 6.2 km || 
|-id=848 bgcolor=#d6d6d6
| 113848 ||  || — || October 7, 2002 || Socorro || LINEAR || HYG || align=right | 5.8 km || 
|-id=849 bgcolor=#d6d6d6
| 113849 ||  || — || October 7, 2002 || Socorro || LINEAR || — || align=right | 4.0 km || 
|-id=850 bgcolor=#d6d6d6
| 113850 ||  || — || October 9, 2002 || Anderson Mesa || LONEOS || EOS || align=right | 3.7 km || 
|-id=851 bgcolor=#d6d6d6
| 113851 ||  || — || October 9, 2002 || Anderson Mesa || LONEOS || — || align=right | 6.1 km || 
|-id=852 bgcolor=#E9E9E9
| 113852 ||  || — || October 7, 2002 || Haleakala || NEAT || WAT || align=right | 3.3 km || 
|-id=853 bgcolor=#E9E9E9
| 113853 ||  || — || October 9, 2002 || Socorro || LINEAR || — || align=right | 5.4 km || 
|-id=854 bgcolor=#d6d6d6
| 113854 ||  || — || October 9, 2002 || Socorro || LINEAR || THM || align=right | 5.8 km || 
|-id=855 bgcolor=#d6d6d6
| 113855 ||  || — || October 7, 2002 || Socorro || LINEAR || KOR || align=right | 3.0 km || 
|-id=856 bgcolor=#fefefe
| 113856 ||  || — || October 7, 2002 || Socorro || LINEAR || — || align=right | 1.5 km || 
|-id=857 bgcolor=#fefefe
| 113857 ||  || — || October 7, 2002 || Socorro || LINEAR || V || align=right | 1.3 km || 
|-id=858 bgcolor=#fefefe
| 113858 ||  || — || October 8, 2002 || Anderson Mesa || LONEOS || — || align=right | 1.3 km || 
|-id=859 bgcolor=#d6d6d6
| 113859 ||  || — || October 8, 2002 || Anderson Mesa || LONEOS || EOS || align=right | 3.2 km || 
|-id=860 bgcolor=#E9E9E9
| 113860 ||  || — || October 9, 2002 || Anderson Mesa || LONEOS || HEN || align=right | 2.4 km || 
|-id=861 bgcolor=#E9E9E9
| 113861 ||  || — || October 9, 2002 || Anderson Mesa || LONEOS || — || align=right | 3.8 km || 
|-id=862 bgcolor=#d6d6d6
| 113862 ||  || — || October 9, 2002 || Anderson Mesa || LONEOS || — || align=right | 5.3 km || 
|-id=863 bgcolor=#d6d6d6
| 113863 ||  || — || October 9, 2002 || Anderson Mesa || LONEOS || — || align=right | 7.3 km || 
|-id=864 bgcolor=#E9E9E9
| 113864 ||  || — || October 9, 2002 || Socorro || LINEAR || — || align=right | 3.8 km || 
|-id=865 bgcolor=#fefefe
| 113865 ||  || — || October 9, 2002 || Socorro || LINEAR || — || align=right | 1.6 km || 
|-id=866 bgcolor=#d6d6d6
| 113866 ||  || — || October 9, 2002 || Socorro || LINEAR || — || align=right | 4.2 km || 
|-id=867 bgcolor=#fefefe
| 113867 ||  || — || October 9, 2002 || Socorro || LINEAR || — || align=right | 1.6 km || 
|-id=868 bgcolor=#fefefe
| 113868 ||  || — || October 9, 2002 || Socorro || LINEAR || — || align=right | 1.3 km || 
|-id=869 bgcolor=#fefefe
| 113869 ||  || — || October 9, 2002 || Socorro || LINEAR || — || align=right | 1.6 km || 
|-id=870 bgcolor=#fefefe
| 113870 ||  || — || October 9, 2002 || Socorro || LINEAR || V || align=right | 1.3 km || 
|-id=871 bgcolor=#fefefe
| 113871 ||  || — || October 9, 2002 || Socorro || LINEAR || — || align=right | 1.6 km || 
|-id=872 bgcolor=#d6d6d6
| 113872 ||  || — || October 9, 2002 || Socorro || LINEAR || VER || align=right | 5.6 km || 
|-id=873 bgcolor=#d6d6d6
| 113873 ||  || — || October 9, 2002 || Socorro || LINEAR || — || align=right | 3.7 km || 
|-id=874 bgcolor=#E9E9E9
| 113874 ||  || — || October 9, 2002 || Socorro || LINEAR || — || align=right | 4.3 km || 
|-id=875 bgcolor=#fefefe
| 113875 ||  || — || October 9, 2002 || Socorro || LINEAR || — || align=right | 1.6 km || 
|-id=876 bgcolor=#fefefe
| 113876 ||  || — || October 9, 2002 || Socorro || LINEAR || — || align=right | 1.6 km || 
|-id=877 bgcolor=#E9E9E9
| 113877 ||  || — || October 9, 2002 || Socorro || LINEAR || — || align=right | 5.4 km || 
|-id=878 bgcolor=#E9E9E9
| 113878 ||  || — || October 9, 2002 || Socorro || LINEAR || — || align=right | 3.2 km || 
|-id=879 bgcolor=#fefefe
| 113879 ||  || — || October 10, 2002 || Palomar || NEAT || FLO || align=right | 1.2 km || 
|-id=880 bgcolor=#fefefe
| 113880 ||  || — || October 10, 2002 || Palomar || NEAT || — || align=right | 1.2 km || 
|-id=881 bgcolor=#d6d6d6
| 113881 ||  || — || October 10, 2002 || Socorro || LINEAR || — || align=right | 6.1 km || 
|-id=882 bgcolor=#E9E9E9
| 113882 ||  || — || October 10, 2002 || Socorro || LINEAR || — || align=right | 2.8 km || 
|-id=883 bgcolor=#fefefe
| 113883 ||  || — || October 10, 2002 || Socorro || LINEAR || V || align=right | 1.2 km || 
|-id=884 bgcolor=#E9E9E9
| 113884 ||  || — || October 10, 2002 || Socorro || LINEAR || — || align=right | 4.0 km || 
|-id=885 bgcolor=#E9E9E9
| 113885 ||  || — || October 10, 2002 || Socorro || LINEAR || — || align=right | 2.4 km || 
|-id=886 bgcolor=#fefefe
| 113886 ||  || — || October 10, 2002 || Socorro || LINEAR || fast? || align=right | 2.8 km || 
|-id=887 bgcolor=#E9E9E9
| 113887 ||  || — || October 11, 2002 || Socorro || LINEAR || — || align=right | 2.9 km || 
|-id=888 bgcolor=#fefefe
| 113888 ||  || — || October 10, 2002 || Socorro || LINEAR || PHO || align=right | 2.7 km || 
|-id=889 bgcolor=#E9E9E9
| 113889 ||  || — || October 10, 2002 || Socorro || LINEAR || — || align=right | 5.6 km || 
|-id=890 bgcolor=#E9E9E9
| 113890 ||  || — || October 9, 2002 || Socorro || LINEAR || — || align=right | 5.0 km || 
|-id=891 bgcolor=#d6d6d6
| 113891 ||  || — || October 9, 2002 || Socorro || LINEAR || — || align=right | 5.2 km || 
|-id=892 bgcolor=#E9E9E9
| 113892 ||  || — || October 9, 2002 || Socorro || LINEAR || — || align=right | 4.9 km || 
|-id=893 bgcolor=#E9E9E9
| 113893 ||  || — || October 9, 2002 || Socorro || LINEAR || — || align=right | 2.0 km || 
|-id=894 bgcolor=#E9E9E9
| 113894 ||  || — || October 9, 2002 || Socorro || LINEAR || — || align=right | 2.6 km || 
|-id=895 bgcolor=#E9E9E9
| 113895 ||  || — || October 9, 2002 || Socorro || LINEAR || — || align=right | 3.1 km || 
|-id=896 bgcolor=#d6d6d6
| 113896 ||  || — || October 9, 2002 || Socorro || LINEAR || HYG || align=right | 6.0 km || 
|-id=897 bgcolor=#fefefe
| 113897 ||  || — || October 9, 2002 || Socorro || LINEAR || V || align=right | 1.2 km || 
|-id=898 bgcolor=#d6d6d6
| 113898 ||  || — || October 9, 2002 || Socorro || LINEAR || EOS || align=right | 6.7 km || 
|-id=899 bgcolor=#d6d6d6
| 113899 ||  || — || October 9, 2002 || Socorro || LINEAR || — || align=right | 6.7 km || 
|-id=900 bgcolor=#fefefe
| 113900 ||  || — || October 9, 2002 || Socorro || LINEAR || V || align=right | 1.7 km || 
|}

113901–114000 

|-bgcolor=#fefefe
| 113901 ||  || — || October 9, 2002 || Socorro || LINEAR || — || align=right | 1.3 km || 
|-id=902 bgcolor=#d6d6d6
| 113902 ||  || — || October 9, 2002 || Socorro || LINEAR || CHA || align=right | 3.5 km || 
|-id=903 bgcolor=#E9E9E9
| 113903 ||  || — || October 9, 2002 || Socorro || LINEAR || — || align=right | 4.5 km || 
|-id=904 bgcolor=#d6d6d6
| 113904 ||  || — || October 9, 2002 || Socorro || LINEAR || — || align=right | 4.5 km || 
|-id=905 bgcolor=#d6d6d6
| 113905 ||  || — || October 10, 2002 || Socorro || LINEAR || EOS || align=right | 4.9 km || 
|-id=906 bgcolor=#E9E9E9
| 113906 ||  || — || October 10, 2002 || Socorro || LINEAR || — || align=right | 4.3 km || 
|-id=907 bgcolor=#fefefe
| 113907 ||  || — || October 10, 2002 || Socorro || LINEAR || — || align=right | 1.4 km || 
|-id=908 bgcolor=#fefefe
| 113908 ||  || — || October 10, 2002 || Socorro || LINEAR || — || align=right | 2.2 km || 
|-id=909 bgcolor=#d6d6d6
| 113909 ||  || — || October 10, 2002 || Socorro || LINEAR || — || align=right | 5.3 km || 
|-id=910 bgcolor=#fefefe
| 113910 ||  || — || October 10, 2002 || Socorro || LINEAR || — || align=right | 2.0 km || 
|-id=911 bgcolor=#E9E9E9
| 113911 ||  || — || October 10, 2002 || Socorro || LINEAR || EUN || align=right | 2.9 km || 
|-id=912 bgcolor=#d6d6d6
| 113912 ||  || — || October 10, 2002 || Socorro || LINEAR || HYG || align=right | 7.5 km || 
|-id=913 bgcolor=#E9E9E9
| 113913 ||  || — || October 10, 2002 || Socorro || LINEAR || — || align=right | 3.3 km || 
|-id=914 bgcolor=#fefefe
| 113914 ||  || — || October 10, 2002 || Socorro || LINEAR || V || align=right | 1.4 km || 
|-id=915 bgcolor=#fefefe
| 113915 ||  || — || October 10, 2002 || Socorro || LINEAR || — || align=right | 1.3 km || 
|-id=916 bgcolor=#d6d6d6
| 113916 ||  || — || October 10, 2002 || Socorro || LINEAR || — || align=right | 8.4 km || 
|-id=917 bgcolor=#d6d6d6
| 113917 ||  || — || October 10, 2002 || Socorro || LINEAR || ALA || align=right | 7.0 km || 
|-id=918 bgcolor=#fefefe
| 113918 ||  || — || October 10, 2002 || Socorro || LINEAR || — || align=right | 1.6 km || 
|-id=919 bgcolor=#E9E9E9
| 113919 ||  || — || October 10, 2002 || Socorro || LINEAR || — || align=right | 2.3 km || 
|-id=920 bgcolor=#E9E9E9
| 113920 ||  || — || October 10, 2002 || Socorro || LINEAR || KRM || align=right | 5.5 km || 
|-id=921 bgcolor=#E9E9E9
| 113921 ||  || — || October 10, 2002 || Socorro || LINEAR || — || align=right | 2.7 km || 
|-id=922 bgcolor=#fefefe
| 113922 ||  || — || October 10, 2002 || Socorro || LINEAR || — || align=right | 1.8 km || 
|-id=923 bgcolor=#E9E9E9
| 113923 ||  || — || October 10, 2002 || Socorro || LINEAR || — || align=right | 2.5 km || 
|-id=924 bgcolor=#E9E9E9
| 113924 ||  || — || October 10, 2002 || Socorro || LINEAR || — || align=right | 6.3 km || 
|-id=925 bgcolor=#d6d6d6
| 113925 ||  || — || October 10, 2002 || Socorro || LINEAR || — || align=right | 6.2 km || 
|-id=926 bgcolor=#d6d6d6
| 113926 ||  || — || October 10, 2002 || Socorro || LINEAR || — || align=right | 8.4 km || 
|-id=927 bgcolor=#fefefe
| 113927 ||  || — || October 10, 2002 || Socorro || LINEAR || — || align=right | 2.4 km || 
|-id=928 bgcolor=#E9E9E9
| 113928 ||  || — || October 10, 2002 || Socorro || LINEAR || — || align=right | 4.7 km || 
|-id=929 bgcolor=#E9E9E9
| 113929 ||  || — || October 10, 2002 || Socorro || LINEAR || — || align=right | 4.4 km || 
|-id=930 bgcolor=#fefefe
| 113930 ||  || — || October 10, 2002 || Socorro || LINEAR || — || align=right | 1.7 km || 
|-id=931 bgcolor=#d6d6d6
| 113931 ||  || — || October 10, 2002 || Socorro || LINEAR || ALA || align=right | 9.8 km || 
|-id=932 bgcolor=#d6d6d6
| 113932 ||  || — || October 10, 2002 || Socorro || LINEAR || URS || align=right | 5.2 km || 
|-id=933 bgcolor=#E9E9E9
| 113933 ||  || — || October 10, 2002 || Socorro || LINEAR || EUN || align=right | 2.5 km || 
|-id=934 bgcolor=#fefefe
| 113934 ||  || — || October 10, 2002 || Socorro || LINEAR || — || align=right | 2.0 km || 
|-id=935 bgcolor=#fefefe
| 113935 ||  || — || October 10, 2002 || Socorro || LINEAR || FLO || align=right | 3.7 km || 
|-id=936 bgcolor=#fefefe
| 113936 ||  || — || October 10, 2002 || Socorro || LINEAR || — || align=right | 1.7 km || 
|-id=937 bgcolor=#fefefe
| 113937 ||  || — || October 10, 2002 || Socorro || LINEAR || FLO || align=right | 2.6 km || 
|-id=938 bgcolor=#E9E9E9
| 113938 ||  || — || October 12, 2002 || Socorro || LINEAR || ADE || align=right | 6.6 km || 
|-id=939 bgcolor=#E9E9E9
| 113939 ||  || — || October 12, 2002 || Socorro || LINEAR || — || align=right | 2.6 km || 
|-id=940 bgcolor=#d6d6d6
| 113940 ||  || — || October 13, 2002 || Palomar || NEAT || — || align=right | 7.2 km || 
|-id=941 bgcolor=#E9E9E9
| 113941 ||  || — || October 13, 2002 || Palomar || NEAT || EUN || align=right | 2.8 km || 
|-id=942 bgcolor=#fefefe
| 113942 ||  || — || October 13, 2002 || Palomar || NEAT || — || align=right | 2.5 km || 
|-id=943 bgcolor=#fefefe
| 113943 ||  || — || October 13, 2002 || Palomar || NEAT || — || align=right | 3.8 km || 
|-id=944 bgcolor=#E9E9E9
| 113944 ||  || — || October 11, 2002 || Socorro || LINEAR || — || align=right | 3.8 km || 
|-id=945 bgcolor=#fefefe
| 113945 ||  || — || October 11, 2002 || Socorro || LINEAR || — || align=right | 1.2 km || 
|-id=946 bgcolor=#E9E9E9
| 113946 ||  || — || October 12, 2002 || Socorro || LINEAR || MRX || align=right | 2.6 km || 
|-id=947 bgcolor=#d6d6d6
| 113947 ||  || — || October 15, 2002 || Palomar || NEAT || EOS || align=right | 3.9 km || 
|-id=948 bgcolor=#fefefe
| 113948 ||  || — || October 11, 2002 || Socorro || LINEAR || — || align=right | 1.1 km || 
|-id=949 bgcolor=#d6d6d6
| 113949 Bahcall ||  ||  || October 4, 2002 || Apache Point || SDSS || — || align=right | 7.3 km || 
|-id=950 bgcolor=#d6d6d6
| 113950 Donbaldwin ||  ||  || October 4, 2002 || Apache Point || SDSS || — || align=right | 2.9 km || 
|-id=951 bgcolor=#d6d6d6
| 113951 Artdavidsen ||  ||  || October 10, 2002 || Apache Point || SDSS || — || align=right | 6.5 km || 
|-id=952 bgcolor=#fefefe
| 113952 Schramm ||  ||  || October 10, 2002 || Apache Point || SDSS || V || align=right data-sort-value="0.92" | 920 m || 
|-id=953 bgcolor=#E9E9E9
| 113953 || 2002 UK || — || October 21, 2002 || Palomar || NEAT || — || align=right | 6.8 km || 
|-id=954 bgcolor=#d6d6d6
| 113954 ||  || — || October 28, 2002 || Kitt Peak || Spacewatch || EMA || align=right | 6.4 km || 
|-id=955 bgcolor=#E9E9E9
| 113955 ||  || — || October 28, 2002 || Haleakala || NEAT || — || align=right | 4.1 km || 
|-id=956 bgcolor=#E9E9E9
| 113956 ||  || — || October 28, 2002 || Palomar || NEAT || EUN || align=right | 2.2 km || 
|-id=957 bgcolor=#d6d6d6
| 113957 ||  || — || October 28, 2002 || Palomar || NEAT || — || align=right | 4.0 km || 
|-id=958 bgcolor=#d6d6d6
| 113958 ||  || — || October 28, 2002 || Palomar || NEAT || EOS || align=right | 3.7 km || 
|-id=959 bgcolor=#E9E9E9
| 113959 ||  || — || October 28, 2002 || Palomar || NEAT || — || align=right | 2.1 km || 
|-id=960 bgcolor=#fefefe
| 113960 ||  || — || October 28, 2002 || Palomar || NEAT || — || align=right | 1.6 km || 
|-id=961 bgcolor=#E9E9E9
| 113961 ||  || — || October 28, 2002 || Palomar || NEAT || — || align=right | 4.3 km || 
|-id=962 bgcolor=#d6d6d6
| 113962 ||  || — || October 28, 2002 || Palomar || NEAT || — || align=right | 5.2 km || 
|-id=963 bgcolor=#fefefe
| 113963 ||  || — || October 26, 2002 || Haleakala || NEAT || — || align=right | 1.8 km || 
|-id=964 bgcolor=#E9E9E9
| 113964 ||  || — || October 26, 2002 || Haleakala || NEAT || — || align=right | 4.0 km || 
|-id=965 bgcolor=#fefefe
| 113965 ||  || — || October 26, 2002 || Haleakala || NEAT || NYS || align=right | 1.1 km || 
|-id=966 bgcolor=#d6d6d6
| 113966 ||  || — || October 28, 2002 || Palomar || NEAT || — || align=right | 6.0 km || 
|-id=967 bgcolor=#fefefe
| 113967 ||  || — || October 31, 2002 || Nogales || Tenagra II Obs. || V || align=right | 1.3 km || 
|-id=968 bgcolor=#d6d6d6
| 113968 ||  || — || October 28, 2002 || Haleakala || NEAT || — || align=right | 6.4 km || 
|-id=969 bgcolor=#fefefe
| 113969 ||  || — || October 28, 2002 || Haleakala || NEAT || PHO || align=right | 1.9 km || 
|-id=970 bgcolor=#d6d6d6
| 113970 ||  || — || October 30, 2002 || Socorro || LINEAR || EOS || align=right | 3.5 km || 
|-id=971 bgcolor=#d6d6d6
| 113971 ||  || — || October 30, 2002 || Palomar || NEAT || — || align=right | 6.0 km || 
|-id=972 bgcolor=#E9E9E9
| 113972 ||  || — || October 30, 2002 || Palomar || NEAT || — || align=right | 2.1 km || 
|-id=973 bgcolor=#E9E9E9
| 113973 ||  || — || October 30, 2002 || Palomar || NEAT || WIT || align=right | 1.8 km || 
|-id=974 bgcolor=#fefefe
| 113974 ||  || — || October 29, 2002 || Nogales || Tenagra II Obs. || FLO || align=right | 1.1 km || 
|-id=975 bgcolor=#fefefe
| 113975 ||  || — || October 30, 2002 || Palomar || NEAT || NYS || align=right | 1.1 km || 
|-id=976 bgcolor=#d6d6d6
| 113976 ||  || — || October 30, 2002 || Haleakala || NEAT || — || align=right | 7.1 km || 
|-id=977 bgcolor=#E9E9E9
| 113977 ||  || — || October 30, 2002 || Haleakala || NEAT || — || align=right | 2.1 km || 
|-id=978 bgcolor=#fefefe
| 113978 ||  || — || October 28, 2002 || Haleakala || NEAT || — || align=right | 1.3 km || 
|-id=979 bgcolor=#d6d6d6
| 113979 ||  || — || October 30, 2002 || Haleakala || NEAT || — || align=right | 5.8 km || 
|-id=980 bgcolor=#d6d6d6
| 113980 ||  || — || October 30, 2002 || Haleakala || NEAT || — || align=right | 5.7 km || 
|-id=981 bgcolor=#fefefe
| 113981 ||  || — || October 30, 2002 || Haleakala || NEAT || V || align=right | 1.1 km || 
|-id=982 bgcolor=#E9E9E9
| 113982 ||  || — || October 30, 2002 || Haleakala || NEAT || — || align=right | 2.4 km || 
|-id=983 bgcolor=#fefefe
| 113983 ||  || — || October 30, 2002 || Haleakala || NEAT || NYS || align=right | 1.5 km || 
|-id=984 bgcolor=#fefefe
| 113984 ||  || — || October 28, 2002 || Palomar || NEAT || FLO || align=right | 1.2 km || 
|-id=985 bgcolor=#d6d6d6
| 113985 ||  || — || October 30, 2002 || Kitt Peak || Spacewatch || EMA || align=right | 6.0 km || 
|-id=986 bgcolor=#d6d6d6
| 113986 ||  || — || October 31, 2002 || Socorro || LINEAR || — || align=right | 7.3 km || 
|-id=987 bgcolor=#E9E9E9
| 113987 ||  || — || October 31, 2002 || Socorro || LINEAR || — || align=right | 3.4 km || 
|-id=988 bgcolor=#E9E9E9
| 113988 ||  || — || October 31, 2002 || Socorro || LINEAR || — || align=right | 2.2 km || 
|-id=989 bgcolor=#fefefe
| 113989 ||  || — || October 31, 2002 || Palomar || NEAT || — || align=right | 1.7 km || 
|-id=990 bgcolor=#fefefe
| 113990 ||  || — || October 30, 2002 || Palomar || NEAT || V || align=right | 1.7 km || 
|-id=991 bgcolor=#fefefe
| 113991 ||  || — || October 30, 2002 || Palomar || NEAT || — || align=right | 3.0 km || 
|-id=992 bgcolor=#fefefe
| 113992 ||  || — || October 31, 2002 || Socorro || LINEAR || — || align=right | 1.2 km || 
|-id=993 bgcolor=#fefefe
| 113993 ||  || — || October 28, 2002 || Haleakala || NEAT || — || align=right | 1.4 km || 
|-id=994 bgcolor=#d6d6d6
| 113994 ||  || — || October 30, 2002 || Haleakala || NEAT || — || align=right | 5.9 km || 
|-id=995 bgcolor=#fefefe
| 113995 ||  || — || October 30, 2002 || Haleakala || NEAT || — || align=right | 1.9 km || 
|-id=996 bgcolor=#fefefe
| 113996 ||  || — || October 31, 2002 || Anderson Mesa || LONEOS || — || align=right | 1.3 km || 
|-id=997 bgcolor=#fefefe
| 113997 ||  || — || October 31, 2002 || Anderson Mesa || LONEOS || — || align=right | 1.2 km || 
|-id=998 bgcolor=#fefefe
| 113998 ||  || — || October 31, 2002 || Anderson Mesa || LONEOS || — || align=right | 1.6 km || 
|-id=999 bgcolor=#d6d6d6
| 113999 ||  || — || October 31, 2002 || Anderson Mesa || LONEOS || EOS || align=right | 5.3 km || 
|-id=000 bgcolor=#d6d6d6
| 114000 ||  || — || October 31, 2002 || Anderson Mesa || LONEOS || — || align=right | 4.3 km || 
|}

References

External links 
 Discovery Circumstances: Numbered Minor Planets (110001)–(115000) (IAU Minor Planet Center)

0113